= Hurricane Richard =

Category 2 Atlantic hurricane in 2010

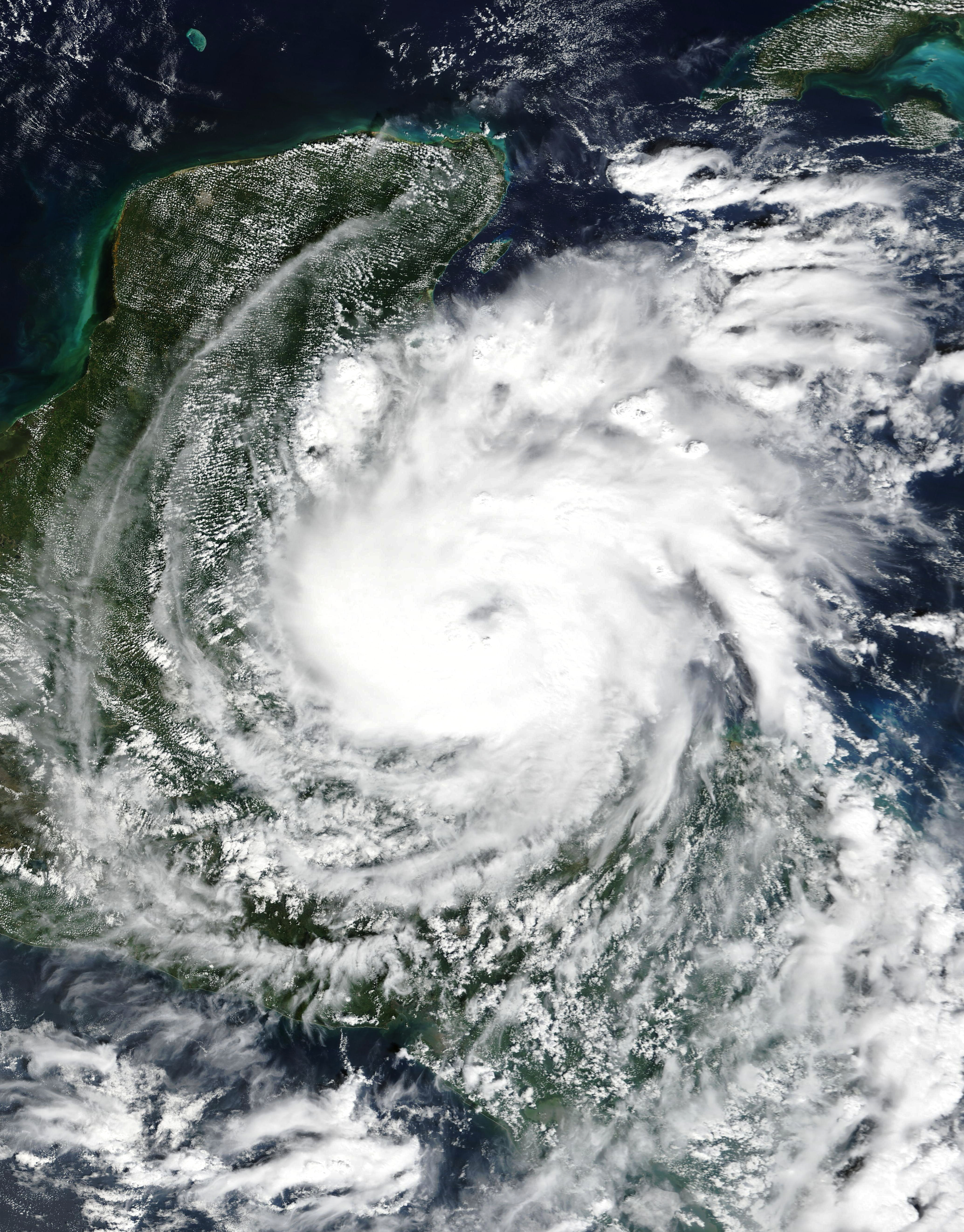
- Richard as a Category 1 hurricane off the Belizean coast on October 24

Meteorological history
- Formed: October 20, 2010
- Remnant low: October 25, 2010
- Dissipated: October 27, 2010

Category 2 hurricane
- 1-minute sustained (SSHWS/NWS)
- Highest winds: 100 mph (155 km/h)
- Lowest pressure: 977 mbar (hPa); 28.85 inHg

Overall effects
- Fatalities: 1 direct, 1 indirect
- Damage: $80 million (2010 USD)
- Areas affected: Honduras, Belize, Guatemala and Mexico
- IBTrACS
- Part of the 2010 Atlantic hurricane season

Hurricane Richard was a damaging tropical cyclone that affected areas of Central America in October 2010. It developed on October 20 from an area of low pressure that had stalled in the Caribbean Sea. The system moved to the southeast before turning to the west. The storm slowly organized, and the system intensified into a tropical storm. Initially, Richard only intensified slowly in an area of weak steering currents. However, by October 23, wind shear diminished, and the storm intensified faster as it headed toward Belize. The next day, Richard intensified into hurricane status, and further into its peak intensity as a Category 2 hurricane, reaching maximum winds of 100 mph (160 km/h). The hurricane made its only landfall on Belize at peak intensity. Over land, Richard quickly weakened, and later degenerated into a remnant low on October 25.

Richard caused an estimated $80 million (2010 USD) in damages in its path. In Honduras, damage was mostly limited to power outages and landslides. In Belize, most of the damage was attributed to damage to crops. Power outages were also widespread across the country; two fatalities occurred there as well.

== Meteorological history ==
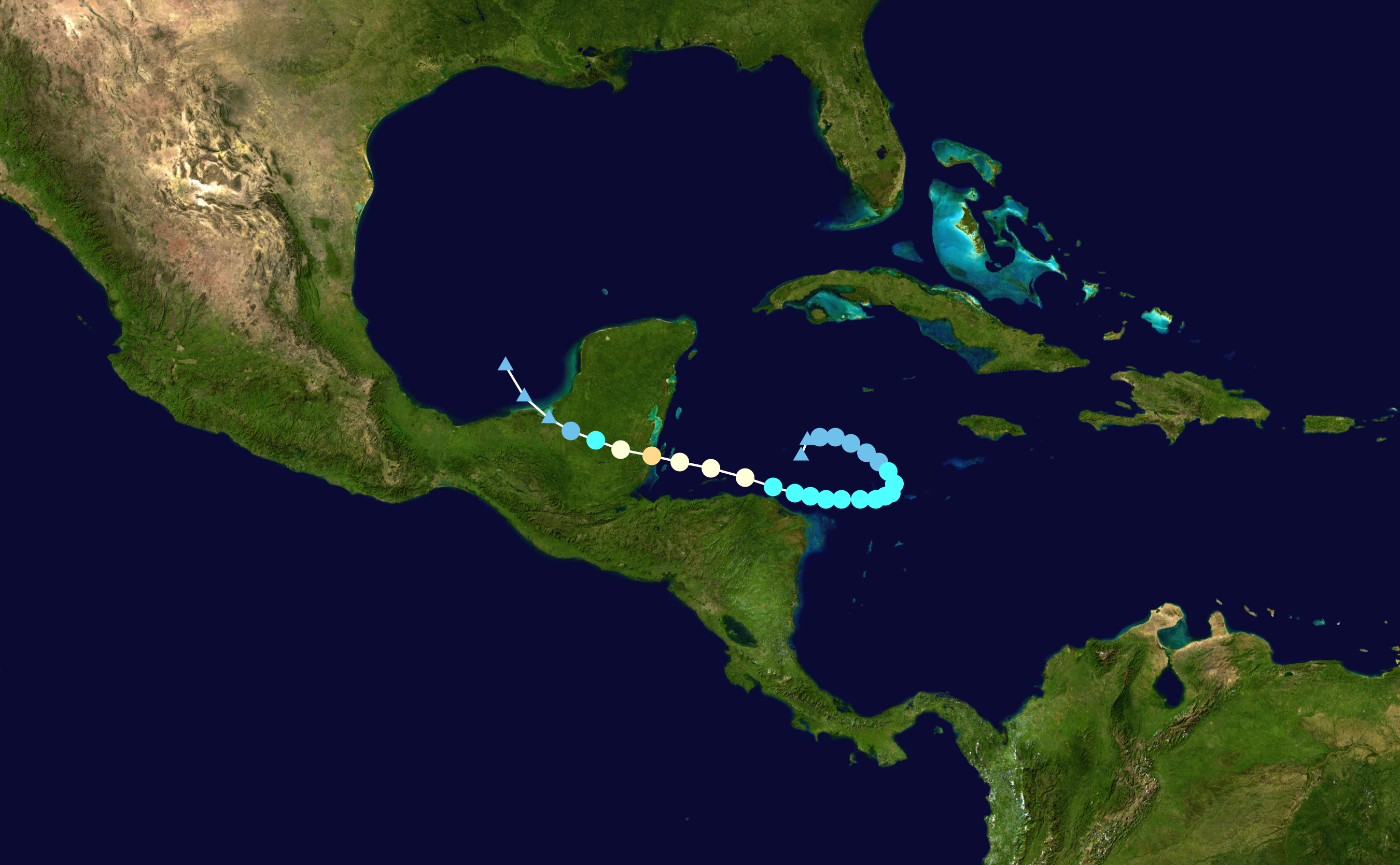
Map plotting the storm's track and intensity, according to the Saffir–Simpson scale Map key Saffir–Simpson scale Tropical depression (≤38 mph, ≤62 km/h) Tropical storm (39–73 mph, 63–118 km/h) Category 1 (74–95 mph, 119–153 km/h) Category 2 (96–110 mph, 154–177 km/h) Category 3 (111–129 mph, 178–208 km/h) Category 4 (130–156 mph, 209–251 km/h) Category 5 (≥157 mph, ≥252 km/h) Unknown Storm type Tropical cyclone Subtropical cyclone Extratropical cyclone, remnant low, tropical disturbance, or monsoon depression

The origins of Hurricane Richard can be traced back to a tropical wave that moved off the African coast on October 4 and moved westward, stalling over Venezuela on October 13. Over the next 3 days, it drifted into the extreme southwestern Caribbean Sea, and soon developed an area of low pressure, until it stalled just north of Panama. On October 16, the National Hurricane Center (NHC) began to monitor that area of disturbed weather in association with a weak trough of low pressure over the southwestern Caribbean Sea, which persisted across the region as Hurricane Paula dissipated over Cuba on the same day. By October 17, the easterly and northerly trade winds flowed into the low, producing a disorganized area of convection, or thunderstorms across the region. For several days the system moved generally west-northwestward toward Central America. Convection increased over the low on October 18, and the National Hurricane Center noted the possibility of further organization due to favorable environmental conditions. Later that day, it passed near the eastern coast of Nicaragua. The storm became more organized as it turned to a north-northwest drift in the northwestern Caribbean Sea.

The Hurricane Hunters investigated the system on October 19 and indicated the development of a low-level circulation. As such, the NHC noted that the storm was very close to tropical depression strength. The next day, after the system turned to the east, strong upper-level wind shear impeded its further development, but such conditions were expected to abate. Early on October 21, the convection had organized and increased near the center of circulation despite still being in an area of moderate wind shear. Due to the organization, the NHC classified it as Tropical Depression Nineteen about 125 miles (201 km) south of Grand Cayman. At the time, the depression was drifting eastward, located near the base of a mid-level trough and toward the west of a subtropical ridge. In the hours after its formation, the center remained located along the western portion of a cyclonically curved rainband as the convection increased. The wind shear decreased, and despite the presence of dry air to its northwest, the depression intensified to Tropical Storm Richard by 1500 UTC on October 21, based on confirmation from the Hurricane Hunters. However post–operational analysis revealed that the depression became a tropical storm slightly earlier, at 1200 UTC.

Tropical Depression Nineteen on October 20, shortly after being classified with a tiny circulation displaced just outside its convection

Upon intensifying to tropical storm status, Richard was moving southeastward, still in an area of weak steering currents and in the midst of undergoing a loop in its track. Two hurricane models predicted for the storm to intensify to major hurricane status over the western Caribbean. The official forecast was for the storm to make landfall on Belize with winds of 90 mph (140 km/h). As Richard continued generally southward early on October 22, its convection became ragged and linear, preventing any initial strengthening. Additionally, the circulation became elongated as the thunderstorms deteriorated, due to the continued presence of dry air and wind shear. After turning westward, Richard moved parallel just offshore the Honduras coast, and its circulation became difficult to locate on satellite imagery.

On October 23, Tropical Storm Richard began strengthening again, after the shear diminished and the storm took advantage of the warm waters of the western Caribbean. Later that day, a mid-level eye feature became evident on satellite imagery. Additionally, the outflow gradually improved and became more symmetrical throughout the circulation. On October 24, Hurricane Hunters indicated that Richard attained hurricane status, based on surface winds of 85 mph (137 km/h). In addition, radar from Belize at the time indicated a nearly-closed eyewall. The hurricane continued intensifying to peak winds of 100 mph (160 km/h), and the minimum central pressure dropped to 977 millibars (28.9 inHg), making it a Category 2 hurricane, despite the fact that it was operationally classified as a Category 1 hurricane with winds of 90 mph (140 km/h) and a pressure of 981 millibars (29.0 inHg).

At around 0045 UTC on October 25, Hurricane Richard made landfall about 20 miles (32 km)/h) south-southeast of Belize City, Belize at peak intensity, and just after moving ashore, the eye briefly became better defined. Within a few hours however, the inner core lost definition as the eye dissipated. The winds rapidly diminished, and Richard weakened to tropical depression status after crossing into northern Guatemala. By then, there was little deep convection remaining, and after emerging into the Bay of Campeche Richard degenerated into a remnant low on October 26, but then turned back east as the system was forced to because of the strong wind shear. After the storm reached the Yucatán Peninsula, the system began turning north until it reached the Gulf of Mexico. The remnants of Hurricane Richard continued to move north over the Gulf of Mexico as it weakened, until the system dissipated completely, late on October 27.

== Preparations and impact ==
=== Honduras ===
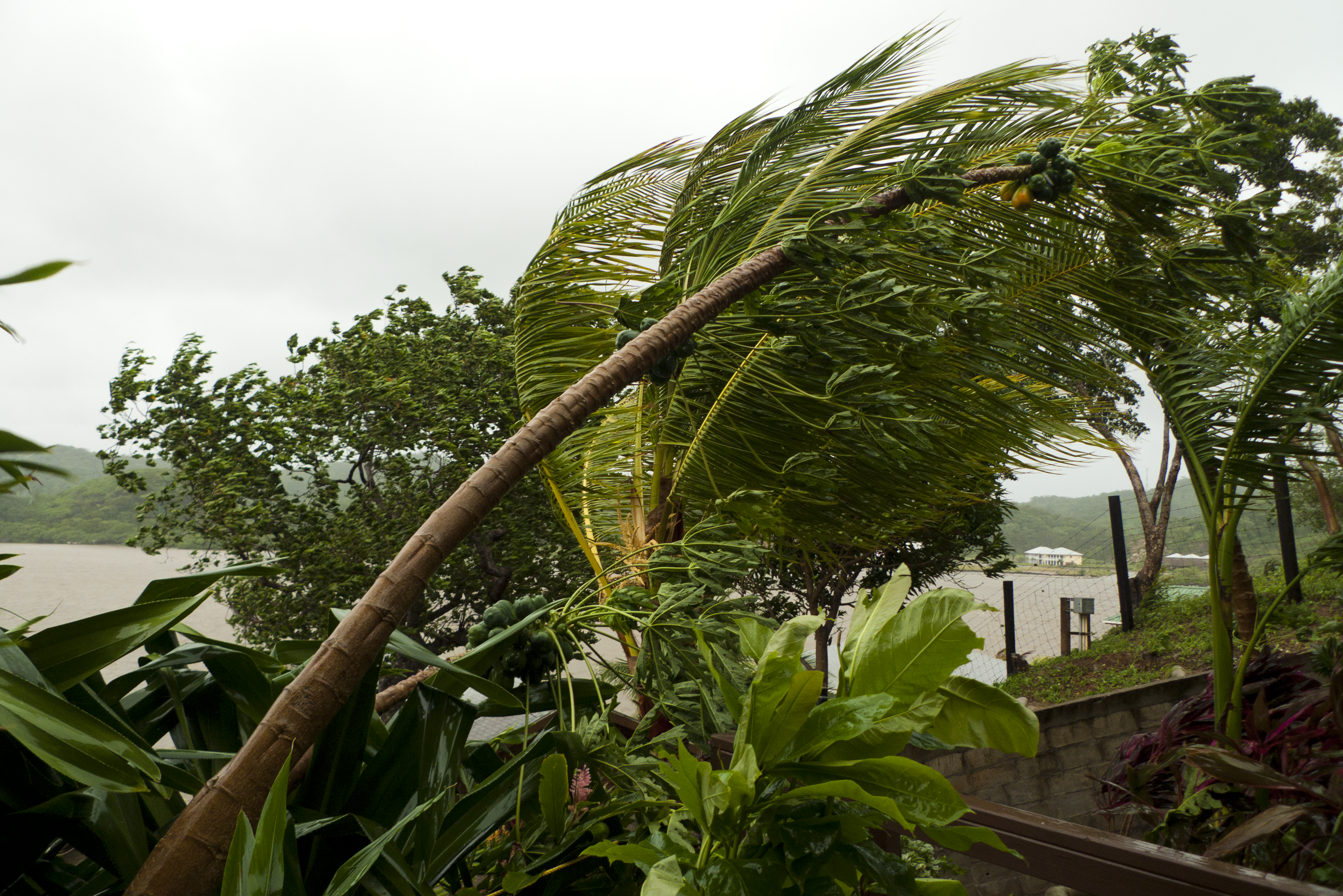
Blustery conditions on the island of Roatán, off the northern coast of Honduras

Starting late on October 21, the Government of Honduras issued a tropical storm watch for then-Tropical Storm Richard, which covered the north coast of Honduras from Limón to the border with Nicaragua. When Richard finally began to head westward on October 22, the tropical storm watch was upgraded to a tropical storm warnings; a hurricane watch was also issued for the same location. By 1500 UTC on October 23, the Government of Honduras had issued a tropical storm warning from Limón heading westward toward Puerto Cortés; the tropical storm warning also included the three Bay Islands of Guanaja, Roatán, and Útila. As Richard was predicted to brush the coast of Honduras just offshore, the tropical storm warning was upgraded to a hurricane warning.

At the time Richard had intensified into a hurricane, it had moved away from eastern Honduras, and the tropical storm warning and hurricane watch was discontinued from Limón to the border with Nicaragua. While Hurricane Richard was approaching Belize on October 24, the Government of Honduras discontinued all watches and warning that had been issued in association with the storm as was no longer considered a possible threat for landfall.

While passing to the north of the country, Richard knocked down trees and power lines on the northern Honduras coast. Some power outages occurring in areas resulted from the fallen power lines. In addition, mudslides triggered by rainfall cut off an estimated 15,000 people in 40 small towns. Four coastal Honduran provinces were declared areas of maximum alert by the government after the storm. The offshore Bay Islands also experienced heavy rainfall due to Richard. Winds on the islands peaked at 58 mph (93 km/h) on Roatán.

=== Belize ===
Hurricane Richard making landfall on Belize on October 25

The Government of Belize began warning of the threat of Richard on October 22, starting with a tropical storm watch issued for the entire east coast of the country. As Tropical Storm Richard was rapidly intensifying, the tropical storm watch on the coast of Belize was replaced with a tropical storm warning, which had been upgraded at 1500 UTC October 23. Only three hours after the replacement of the tropical storm watch to warning, Richard was nearing hurricane status, and the tropical storm warning in place on the east coast of Belize upgraded to a hurricane warning. The hurricane warning associated with Hurricane Richard remained in place for the east coast of Belize as landfall was occurring, since the storm made landfall to the south-southeast of Belize City. Prior to the storm's landfall, an estimated 10,000 people took refuge in storm shelters and churches.

Throughout Belize, Hurricane Richard damaged thousands of homes and leaving many without power. The Belize Zoo and Tropical Education Center, a major attraction for ecotourists and Belizeans, was in the path and heavily damaged forcing it to close to remove debris and repair their animal exhibits. Overall damage was BZ$33.8 million ($17.4 million 2010 USD), most of which from crop damage, especially to citrus fruits. The entire grapefruit harvest was lost, an estimated 25% of orange crops were lost, and several large trees were downed. In addition, about 200 homes were destroyed. There were two reported fatalities occurred. One person drowned after his ship capsized during the storm and another was mauled to death by a jaguar that had escaped when a tree fell on its cage.

=== Mexico ===
The Government of Mexico also gave warnings of the approaching Richard, first issuing a hurricane watch also the east coast of the Yucatán Peninsula from Punta Gruesa southward to the city of Chetumal, which is on the border with Belize. In addition to the hurricane watch issued for that portion for the Yucatán Peninsula, a tropical storm warning was set in effect for the same area. Although Hurricane Richard approached closely to the Mexican portion of the Yucatán Peninsula, there were no changes to the watches and warning from 1500 UTC October 23 to the time of landfall in Belize. After Hurricane Richard made landfall in Belize, the Government of Mexico discontinued the hurricane watch from Punta Gruesa southward to Chetumal, although the tropical storm warnings have been cancelled.

Governor of Quintana Roo Félix González Canto declared Chetumal as the highest state of alert prior to Richard. However, areas on the northeastern coast of the Yucatán Peninsula were put on only minimum alert by the government.

== See also ==
- Tropical cyclones in 2010
- List of Category 2 Atlantic hurricanes
- Timeline of the 2010 Atlantic hurricane season
- Hurricane Earl (2016) – Category 1 hurricane that followed a similar track
- Tropical Storm Sara (2024) – followed a similar track
