= Tropical Storm Matthew (2010) =

Atlantic tropical storm in 2010

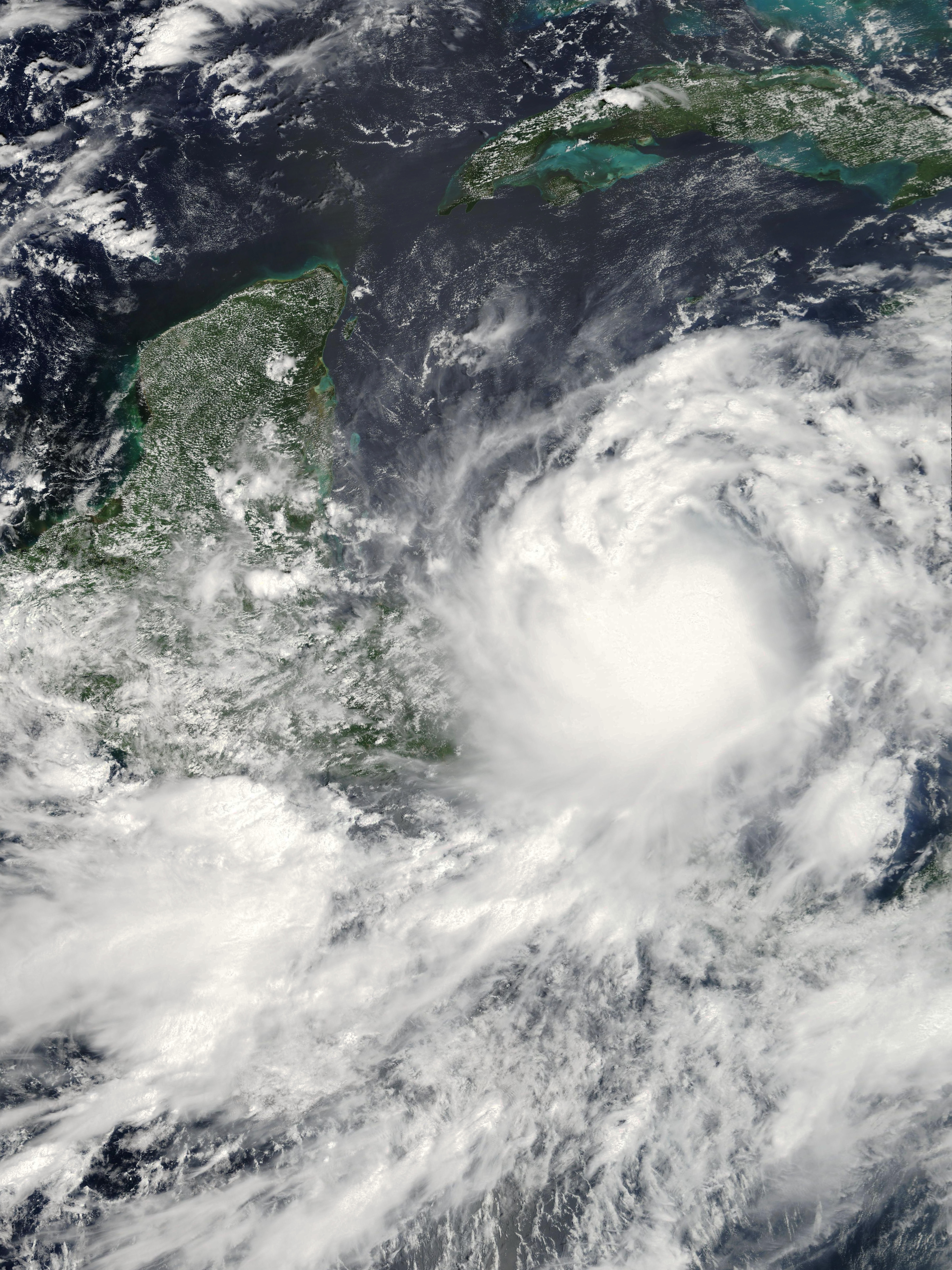
- Matthew approaching Nicaragua on September 24

Meteorological history
- Formed: September 23, 2010
- Remnant low: September 26, 2010
- Dissipated: September 28, 2010

Tropical storm
- 1-minute sustained (SSHWS/NWS)
- Highest winds: 60 mph (95 km/h)
- Lowest pressure: 998 mbar (hPa); 29.47 inHg

Overall effects
- Fatalities: 126 direct
- Missing: 17
- Damage: $171 million (2010 USD)
- Areas affected: Venezuela, Central America, Mexico, Jamaica
- IBTrACS
- Part of the 2010 Atlantic hurricane season

Tropical Storm Matthew was a weak but deadly and destructive tropical cyclone which made landfall in Central America during the 2010 Atlantic hurricane season. The fifteenth tropical cyclone and thirteenth named storm of the year, Matthew formed on September 23 and lost its tropical characteristics in the morning of September 26. However, its remnants continued to produce life-threatening rain over parts of Central America as it dissipated.

Throughout Central and South America, torrential rain produced by Matthew triggered widespread flooding and landslides. Eight people were killed by the storm in Venezuela, and at least 100 people have been confirmed dead throughout Central America and southern Mexico. In Mexico, a massive landslide, roughly 200 ft (61 m) long, buried nearly 300 homes. Initially, officials feared hundreds of casualties, but the impact was much less fatal than expected.

Despite the disastrous loss of life caused by the storm, the name Matthew was not retired and was used again in the 2016 season, though it would be retired following that season.

== Meteorological history ==
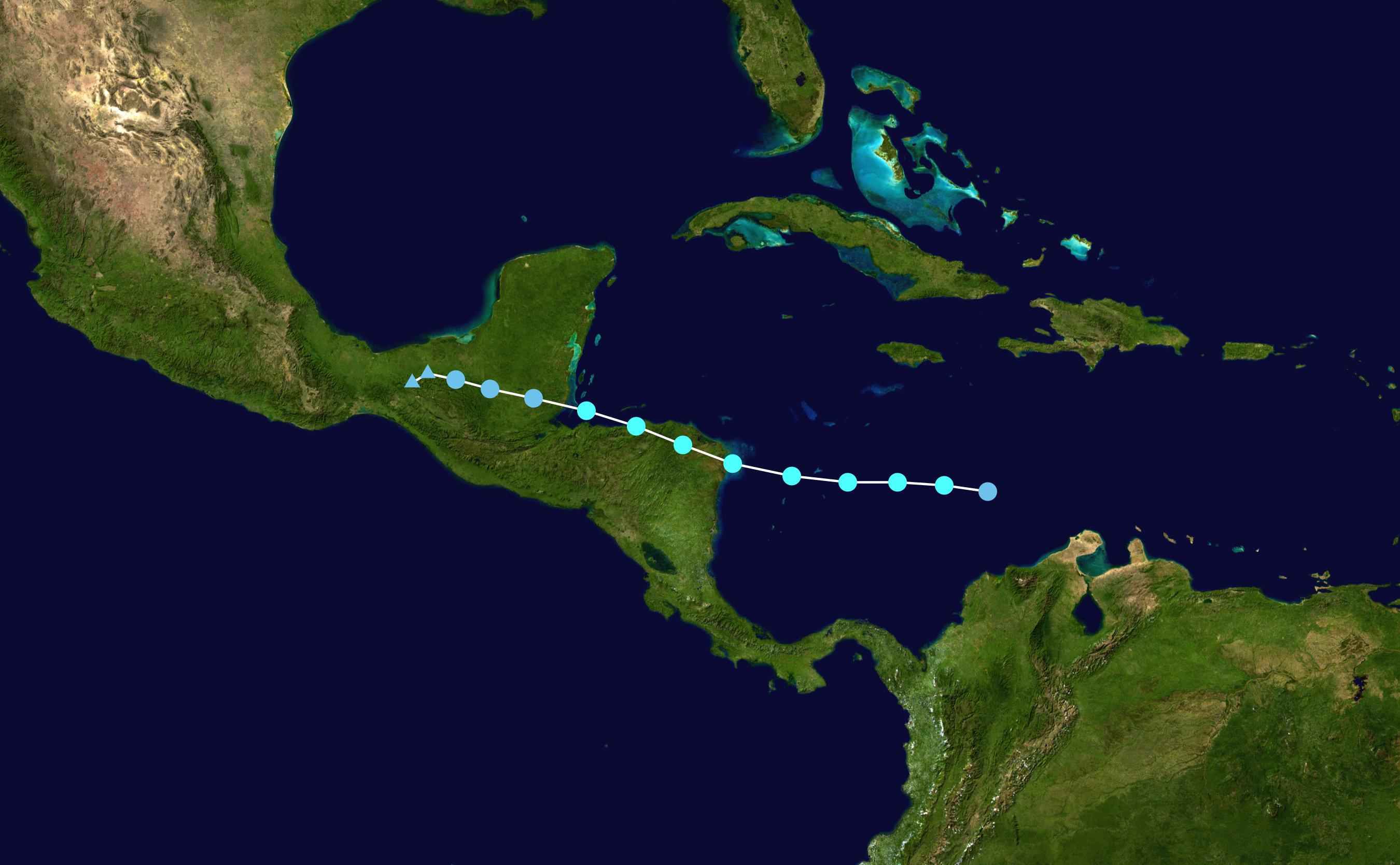
Map plotting the storm's track and intensity, according to the Saffir–Simpson scale Map key Saffir–Simpson scale Tropical depression (≤38 mph, ≤62 km/h) Tropical storm (39–73 mph, 63–118 km/h) Category 1 (74–95 mph, 119–153 km/h) Category 2 (96–110 mph, 154–177 km/h) Category 3 (111–129 mph, 178–208 km/h) Category 4 (130–156 mph, 209–251 km/h) Category 5 (≥157 mph, ≥252 km/h) Unknown Storm type Tropical cyclone Subtropical cyclone Extratropical cyclone, remnant low, tropical disturbance, or monsoon depression

The origins of Tropical Storm Matthew were from a tropical wave that emerged into the Atlantic from the west coast of Africa on September 11. On the following day, that tropical wave contributed to the development of Hurricane Julia near Cape Verde. The southern portion of the system continued westward into the Atlantic with minimal development until September 20. After no further organization over the last eight days, convection associated with the tropical wave began to increase, and the National Hurricane Center (NHC) first mentioned the wave as an area for potential tropical cyclogenesis on September 21, noting favorable environmental conditions. However, deep convection associated with the system remained disorganized, despite surface and air data indicating an organizing surface circulation. A low pressure area formed on September 22 near Curaçao in the south-central Caribbean Sea; at that point, the NHC assessed a high chance of tropical cyclone development. The thunderstorm activity remained disorganized, but on September 23 the convection increased and became better organized, and curved bands developed throughout the day. Late that day, a Hurricane Hunters flight into the system confirmed the development of a well-defined circulation, and the NHC initiated advisories on Tropical Depression Fifteen about 485 mi (781 km) east of Puerto Cabezas, Nicaragua. However, post-analysis indicated that the system had already been a tropical depression for six hours.

While the National Hurricane Center initially classified the depression, it was noted in post-analysis that the system had already intensified into Tropical Storm Matthew, but was operationally carried as a tropical depression until 21:00 UTC September 23. based on confirmation from Hurricane Hunters. At the time, it was moving generally westward, due to a subtropical ridge over the northwestern Caribbean Sea and Gulf of Mexico. Tropical cyclone prediction models anticipated a path near or over Nicaragua, followed by Matthew stalling near the Yucatán Peninsula due to a collapse in steering currents. There was uncertainty in the timing of the latter events, and the NHC noted that great intensification could occur if the storm remained over warm waters; this was due to favorable conditions, such as sea surface temperatures exceeding 30 °C (86 °F) and an upper-level anticyclone providing good outflow. As the storm gradually strengthened during the morning of September 24 after a burst in convection, and the National Hurricane Center noted that there was a considerable uncertainty over the path Matthew would take in the long run. Some numerical models forecast the tropical storm to pass through the Yucatán Peninsula into the Bay of Campeche, while others forecast Matthew to reach the peninsula's coast, then do a sharp turn to the northeast back into the Caribbean Sea. As such, the NHC considered its track forecast—and by extension, its intensity forecast—to be of "low confidence."

Tropical Storm Matthew attained its peak intensity on September 24, 18:00, UTC, with maximum sustained winds of 60 mph (97 km/h) and a minimum barometric pressure of 998 mbar (998 hPa; 29.5 inHg). Only an hour later, Matthew made landfall 23 mi (37 km) south of the border of Nicaragua and Honduras on September 24 with winds of 60 mph (97 km/h). Matthew briefly emerged into the Gulf of Honduras and did not re-intensified due to its close proximity with land. Heading west-northwestward toward Belize, Matthew made landfall near Monkey River Town with winds of 40 mph (64 km/h). After moving inland, Matthew quickly weakened, and was a strong tropical depression only three hours later. From thereon, Matthew underwent further gradual weakening while simultaneously losing forward speed as it moved over southern Mexico. In the morning of September 26, it finally justified its forecast faith by weakening to a remnant low; however, it continued to produce heavy rainfalls over parts of eastern Mexico and other parts of Central America. Matthew's remnants dissipated completely over Mexico, however increased moisture and convection throughout the Bay of Campeche and Caribbean Sea contributed to the development of Tropical Storm Nicole only two days after.

== Preparations ==
As the NHC issued its first advisory on the tropical depression, a tropical storm warning was issued from Puerto Cabezas, Nicaragua northward to Limón, Honduras, including offshore islands; a hurricane watch was issued from the same area.

Countries throughout Central America put their territory under various levels of alert as a result of Matthew's formation. Costa Rica issued a yellow alert for its coastal region, citing the chance for an indirect impact from the storm. Honduras issued a yellow alert for the Ulúa River area, and issued green alerts for 11 departments of Honduras. On the border with Nicaragua, small communities in the Gracias a Dios province were evacuated, forcing at least 300 people out of their homes. Authorities said that classes would be suspended until further notice and that 15,000 schools had been made available to be used as shelters.

Guatemalan authorities ordered evacuations in Izabal between the mouth of the Motagua River and Punta de Manabique. Additionally, the country's Institute of Seismology, Vulcanology, Meteorology and Hydrology (Insivumeh) noted that Guatemala had experienced the most rain since the 1940s as a result of previous storm systems. In neighboring Belize, officials began evacuating three towns near the border with Guatemala after flood waters rose.

== Impact ==
Effects by country
Country	State/province/department	Fatalities	Missing	Damage (in USD)
Venezuela	Capital District	7	0	Unknown
Venezuela	Sucre	1	0	Unknown
Nicaragua	-	70	0	$10.2 million
Honduras	-	4	0	Unknown
Belize	-	0	0	Unknown
El Salvador	-	1	0	Unknown
Guatemala	-	0	0	Unknown
Mexico	Chiapas	23	13	Unknown
Mexico	Nuevo León	4	1	Unknown
Mexico	Oaxaca	7	0	$161 million
Mexico	Veracruz	9	3	Unknown
Total		126	17	$171.2 million

=== Southeastern Caribbean and Venezuela ===
The precursor tropical wave produced showers and thunderstorms across the Leeward Islands on September 22, and a station on Saint Lucia reported a wind gust of 48 mph (77 km/h). The next day, squally weather spread into the ABC Islands, Venezuela, and Colombia. In Caracas, Venezuela, heavy rains associated with Matthew triggered significant flooding that destroyed several homes, killing at least seven people. Another person, a 70-year-old man, was swept away by a swollen river in the northeastern state of Sucre later that day.

=== Central America ===
Matthew made landfall in Central America as a tropical storm, causing torrential rainfalls and local flooding in several parts of mainly Honduras, Belize and Guatemala. Minor wind damage has also been reported in some areas, and the passing of the storm has temporarily left several residents without power. As of now, the exact damage to these countries is unknown, but less severe than expected. At least 69 deaths have been confirmed throughout Central America; Nicaragua reported at least 66 fatalities, while three people were confirmed dead in El Salvador.

==== Honduras ====
Matthew hit Honduras as a tropical storm on September 24, with maximum sustained winds of over 50 mph (80 km/h). Several power lines were toppled due to strong gusts; thousands of residents were left without power for hours, and forecasters warned that heavy rains threaten could cause flooding and mudslides in disaster-prone parts of several Central American nations. In Olanchito, near the northern coast, a creek overflowed and flooded a house, but firefighters were able to rescue its 10 occupants. Several homes and roads were damaged and made inaccessible, as well as at least nine bridges. Furthermore, there were no immediate reports of major damage; however, grain, banana, and sugarcane crops were severely damaged as rivers burst their banks. There were no initial reports of casualties, though 15 people were reported missing after boarding a sailboat off the coast of Honduras.

==== Guatemala ====
Retaining tropical depression status as it crossed the country, Matthew produced heavy rainfalls that hit Guatemala on September 25, causing scattered flooding across certain parts of the country. Authorities from Puerto Barrios—presumably the hardest-hit Guatemalan city—reported heavy flooding and several knocked-down trees caused by potent winds. The storm also produced significant flooding on sugar and coffee farms, which was believed to lead to serious sugar losses due to already-flooded cane fields from earlier rainfalls. Coffee trees also risked disease and fungus growth from too much moisture. All in all, Guatemalan sugar producers forecast that its harvest in November would be five percent lower than the 2.34 million metric tons produced in October 2009. There have been no reports of deaths or injuries as a result of Matthew in the country.

==== Nicaragua ====
Heavy flooding across the country caused the collapse of several bridges and destroyed roads and communication lines, making it impossible to contact all affected communities. As assessments continued, concern awoke for the region's heavy agriculture production and the effects on livelihoods and economies. The storm and subsequent rainfalls have affected 255 communities, 80 municipalities in nine of the 16 provinces of the country, in the north, west and south. More than 1,000 families, some 6,200 people fled dangerous situations because of the rains in Nicaragua alone, seeking refuge in 72 active shelters. Throughout the country, 66 people were reported dead as a result of heavy rainfalls associated with Matthew.

Throughout the country, the storm wrought roughly 207 million córdoba ($10.2 million, 2010 USD) in damage.

=== Mexico ===
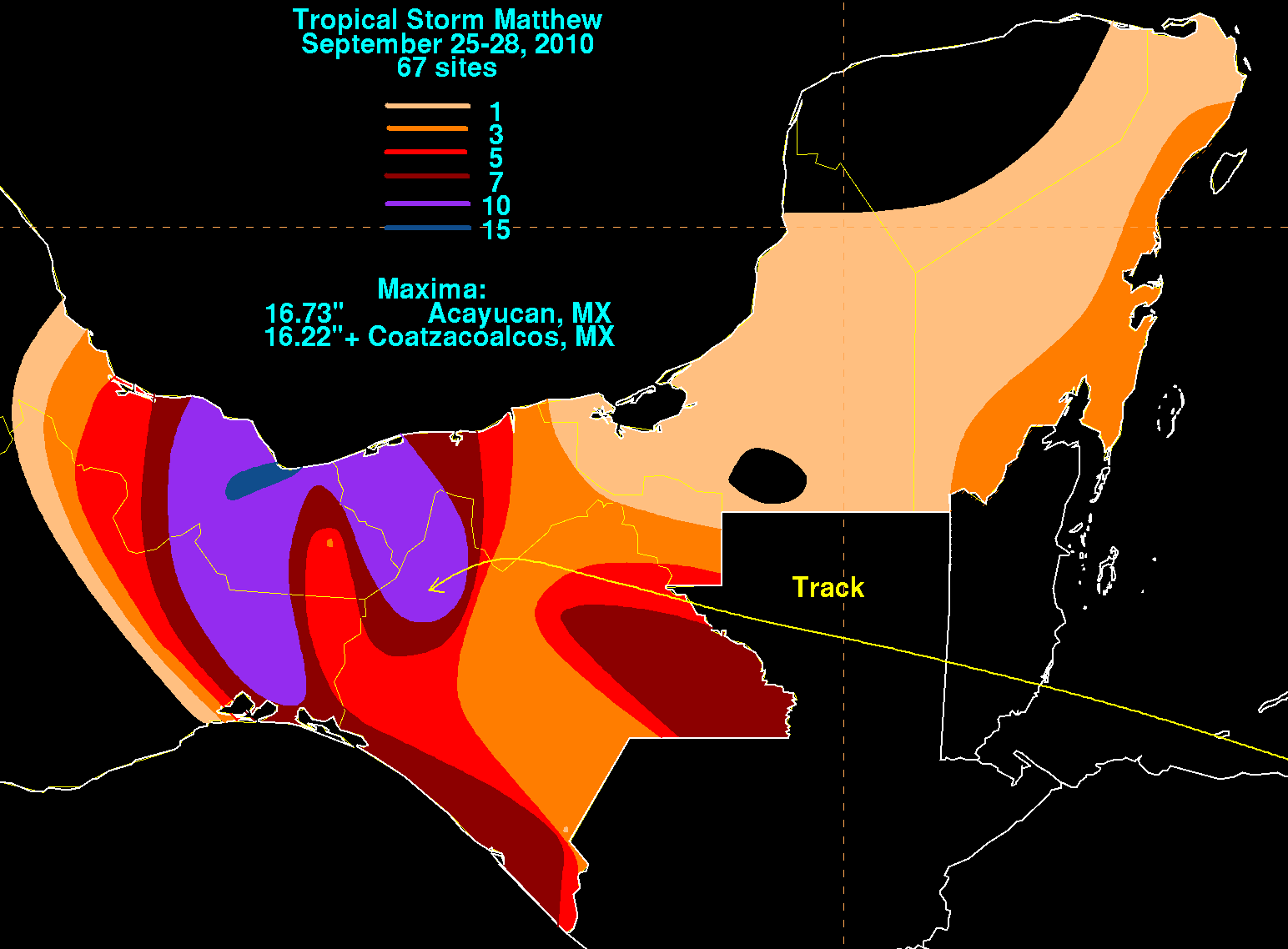
Storm total rainfall from Matthew in Mexico

As a tropical depression, Matthew moved into southern Mexico and dissipated, although the National Hurricane Center noted the potential for heavy rainfall accumulations of up to 30 in (760 mm) in isolated regions; the agency also noted for the possibility of "life threatening flash floods and mud slides". Throughout Mexico, at least 32 people have died due to several mudslides.

Throughout Oaxaca, damage from the storm was estimated to be at least 2 billion MXN (US$161 million). In Veracruz, Mexico, the combined damage from Matthew and earlier Hurricane Karl wrought roughly 100 billion MXN (US$8 billion) in damage; it is unknown exactly how much of the total is due to Matthew.

Mexico was experiencing some of the heaviest rains in recent memory prior to Matthew's arrival. Thousands were forced from their homes in southern part of the country due to the rains. The city of Santa María Tlahuitoltepec, in which one of the landslides occurred, has a population of 9,000, majority of whom are Mixe Indians. The landslide occurred at 4 a.m. local time, in a mountainous area flooded by torrential rains. Part of a hill collapsed on a length of 656 ft (200 m), destroying more than 300 houses. The Governor of the state, Ulises Ruiz Ortiz, earlier said that it is too early to say how many victims were trapped or buried under the earth, but initially estimated that number of missing could be 600 to 1,000 people. It was later advised that eleven people were missing, and no fatalities had been initially confirmed; however, up to six people were confirmed dead several days later, finalizing the death toll. The Mexican military has attempted to reach the town, alongside hundreds of rescue workers that had been sent in to assist the victims. However, difficulties arose due to floods and landslides along the way while attempting to reach the area. Mexican Red Cross stated that it was sending 40 health specialists, rescue dogs and 15 emergency vehicles to the area.

== See also ==
- Tropical cyclones in 2010
- Tropical Storm Hermine (1980)
- Tropical Storm Harvey (2011)
- Tropical Storm Barry (2013)
