= List of storms named Colin =

The name Colin has been used for three tropical cyclones in the Atlantic Ocean, one in the Australian region of the South Pacific Ocean and one in the South-West Indian Ocean.

In the Atlantic:

- Tropical Storm Colin (2010), heavily sheared storm which moved across the Atlantic, dissipated before reaching Bermuda
- Tropical Storm Colin (2016), poorly organized and weak tropical storm that made landfall in Florida causing considerable damage
- Tropical Storm Colin (2022), short-lived and weak tropical storm that made landfall in South Carolina causing minimal damage

In the South Pacific:

- Cyclone Colin (1976), moved parallel to the eastern coast of Australia without making landfall

In the South-West Indian:

- Cyclone Colin (2014), churned through the open ocean, never threatened land
