= Tropical Storm Colin (2010) =

Atlantic tropical storm in 2010

- Colin shortly after regenerating into a tropical storm on August 5

Meteorological history
- Formed: August 2, 2010
- Remnant low: August 8
- Dissipated: August 9, 2010

Tropical storm
- 1-minute sustained (SSHWS/NWS)
- Highest winds: 60 mph (95 km/h)
- Lowest pressure: 1005 mbar (hPa); 29.68 inHg

Overall effects
- Fatalities: 1 direct
- Damage: Minimal
- Areas affected: Leeward Islands, Bermuda, The Carolinas and New England
- IBTrACS
- Part of the 2010 Atlantic hurricane season

Tropical Storm Colin was a tropical cyclone that brought squally weather to Bermuda and caused extensive rip currents across the East Coast of the United States in August 2010. The fourth tropical cyclone and third named storm of the 2010 Atlantic hurricane season, Colin developed as a tropical depression from a low-pressure area in the central Atlantic on August 2. After forming, the storm initially strengthened gradually, attaining tropical storm status early on August 3. However, due to its acceleration to the west-northwest, Colin was unable to maintain a closed circulation and subsequently degenerated into a trough later that day. The National Hurricane Center noted the possibility of regeneration over subsequent days, and by August 5, Colin had once again become a tropical cyclone. Despite moderate wind shear impacting the system, Colin reached a peak intensity of 60 mph (97 km/h) on August 5. However, vertical wind shear prevented further intensification and eventually weakened the storm. By early on August 8, Colin had weakened to a tropical depression, and dissipated near Bermuda shortly after. Though it remained well offshore, Colin produced rough seas along the East Coast of the United States. At least 205 ocean rescues were made. In Bermuda, effects were generally minimal. Less than 1 inch (25 mm) of rain fell and winds remained below tropical storm force.

== Meteorological history ==
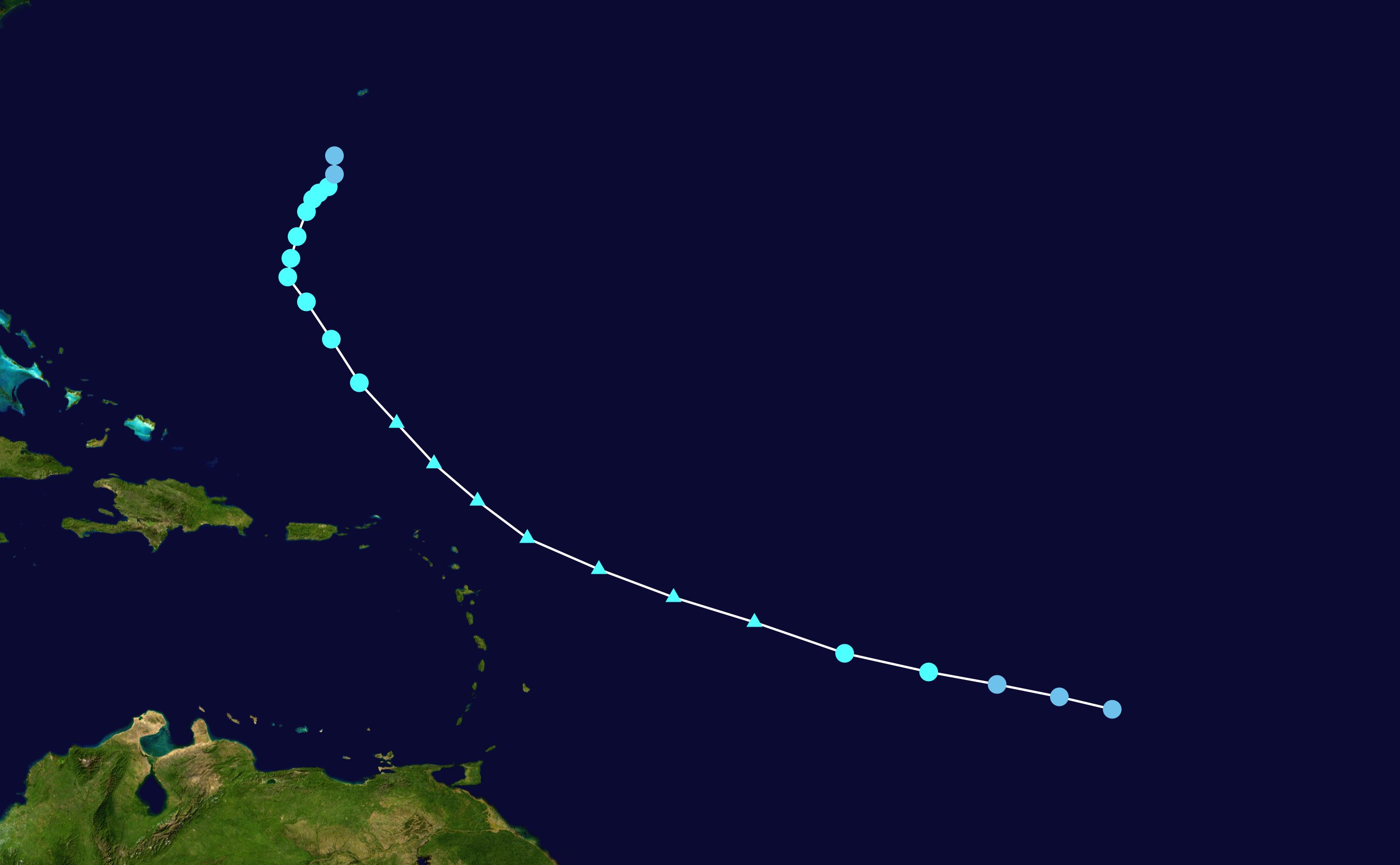
Map plotting the storm's track and intensity, according to the Saffir–Simpson scale Map key Saffir–Simpson scale Tropical depression (≤38 mph, ≤62 km/h) Tropical storm (39–73 mph, 63–118 km/h) Category 1 (74–95 mph, 119–153 km/h) Category 2 (96–110 mph, 154–177 km/h) Category 3 (111–129 mph, 178–208 km/h) Category 4 (130–156 mph, 209–251 km/h) Category 5 (≥157 mph, ≥252 km/h) Unknown Storm type Tropical cyclone Subtropical cyclone Extratropical cyclone, remnant low, tropical disturbance, or monsoon depression

The origins of Tropical Storm Colin can be traced back to an elongated tropical wave that moved westward from Nigeria to Senegal on July 28. A nearly stationary trough separated from the wave as it continued westward. A larger tropical wave emerged off the west coast of Africa a few days later. A broad area of low pressure resulted from the consolidation of the two waves on August 1, when it was situated about 750 mi (1,210 km) west-southwest of the Cape Verde Islands. Over the course of the next 24 hours, shower and thunderstorm activity became increasingly consolidated with the low, but the system lacked a well-defined circulation to be considered a tropical cyclone at the time. However, on the next day, an Advanced Scatterometer (ASCAT) pass revealed that the circulation center had become sufficiently defined, and the National Hurricane Center (NHC) initiated advisories on Tropical Depression Four at 1200 UTC on August 2. Further organization occurred as the depression moved around the southern periphery of a strong subtropical ridge. Thunderstorm activity became increasingly well defined, and it is estimated that the depression became Tropical Storm Colin at 0600 UTC on August 3 while centered 840 mi (1,350 km) east of the Lesser Antilles.

Tropical Storm Colin at its initial peak strength in the open Atlantic on August 3

Early on August 3, Colin's forward motion increased, and the cyclone was unable to maintain a closed circulation. The tropical storm degenerated into a trough at 1800 UTC, although tropical storm-force winds persisted. As the remnants passed north of the northern Leeward Islands, a reconnaissance aircraft investigated the system on August 4, but no closed circulation was found. As the remnants approached a weakness in the subtropical ridge across the western Atlantic on August 5, its forward speed gradually slowed as well. A combination of microwave and satellite imagery during the morning hours of August 5 revealed the reformation of a closed low, and Colin's remnants regained tropical storm status at this time while located 280 mi (450 km) north-northeast of San Juan, Puerto Rico.

Despite relatively unfavorable vertical wind shear impacting Colin, deep thunderstorm activity developed atop its center of circulation. Data from a reconnaissance aircraft during the afternoon hours of August 5 revealed that the system reached a peak intensity with winds of 60 mph (97 km/h) and a minimum barometric pressure of 1,005 mbar (29.7 inHg). A few computer models, namely the Geophysical Fluid Dynamics Laboratory (GFDL) and Hurricane Weather Research and Forecasting model (HWRF), predicted that Colin would briefly attain hurricane status. However, the surrounding moderate vertical wind shear prevented this. While turning towards the north on August 6, the cyclone entered an area increasingly unfavorable wind shear and cooler sea surface temperatures, subsequently prompting the NHC to downgrade Colin to a tropical depression by 0000 UTC on August 8. Further weakening occurred over the next few hours as the cyclone's center of circulation became elongated, and Colin once again degenerated into a trough of low pressure at 1200 UTC while located approximately 100 mi (160 km) southwest of Bermuda. The remnant trough persisted until early on August 9, at which time it was situated 150 mi (240 km) northwest of the island.

== Preparations and impact ==
Following Colin's regeneration into a tropical cyclone on August 5, the Government of Bermuda simultaneously issued a tropical storm warning for the island. Along south-facing beaches, Colin was expected to produce a storm surge between 2 and 3 ft (0.61 and 0.91 m), possibly reaching as high as 5 ft (1.5 m). Significant rainfall was also anticipated, with totals averaging 4 to 6 in (100 to 150 mm). These values were later decreased after Colin weakened on August 6, with only a minimal storm surge forecast and rainfall roughly 1 in (25 mm) less than previously stated. By August 7, all beaches were closed across the island due to rough seas and dangerous rip currents. The Royal Caribbean cruise ship, MS Explorer of the Seas, arrived in Bermuda that same day and was scheduled to set sail again on August 8; however, due to the threat of Colin, the vessel was forced leave later in the day instead of staying overnight. On August 8, the tropical storm warning in place for Bermuda was downgraded to a watch as Colin weakened to a tropical depression; it was discontinued hours later as the storm quickly dissipated.

Due to Colin's weakening to a tropical depression prior to its closest pass to Bermuda, its effects were significantly less than initially anticipated. Winds from the storm reached 31 mph (50 km/h), with gusts to 37 mph (60 km/h). Rainfall was limited to isolated showers and thunderstorms; the Bermuda International Airport measured 0.16 in (4.1 mm) of rain in relation to Colin.

Although situated several hundred miles off the coast of the East Coast of the United States, the outer effects of Colin were expected to create dangerous rip currents along the North and South Carolina coastlines, as well as waves as high as 3 to 4 ft (0.91 to 1.22 m). On August 7, a 51-year-old man drowned off the coast of Ocracoke, North Carolina after being caught in a rip current. Shortly after his death, officials issued rip current and undertow threats for the region. Between August 7 and 9, at least 205 ocean rescues were made along the North Carolina coastline due to rough seas produced by Colin.

== See also ==
- Other storms of the same name
- Timeline of the 2010 Atlantic hurricane season
