= Real Bella Vista =

Honduran football club

- Full name: Real Bella Vista Football Club
- Nickname: Bella Vista

Real Bella Vista F.C. is a Honduran football club, based in Limón, Honduras.

== History ==
They were relegated to Liga Mayor after the 2007-08 season.
