= Hurricane Julia (2010) =

Category 4 Atlantic hurricane in 2010

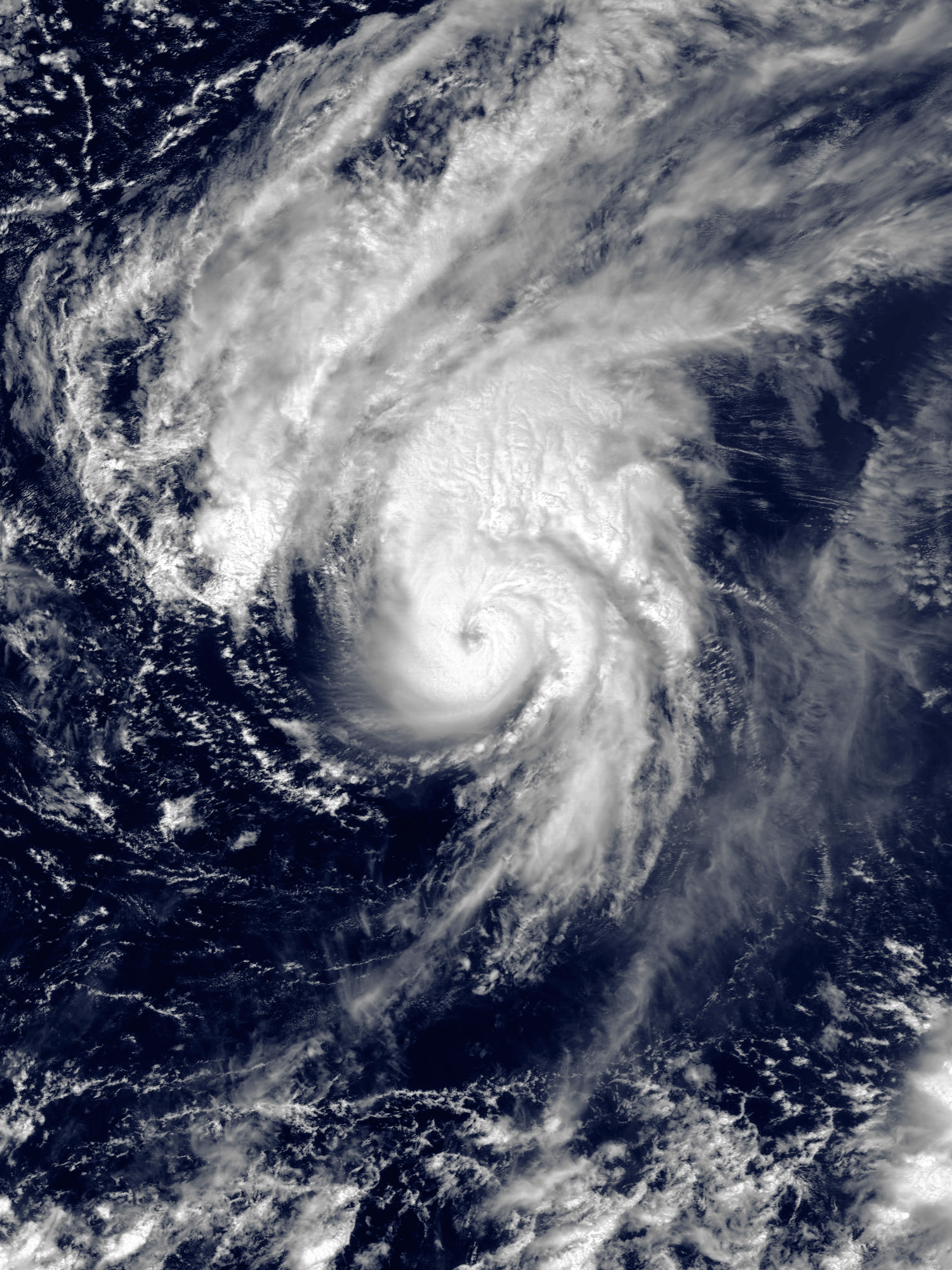
- Hurricane Julia at peak intensity west of the Cape Verde Islands on September 15

Meteorological history
- Formed: September 12, 2010
- Extratropical: September 20, 2010
- Dissipated: September 28, 2010

Category 4 major hurricane
- 1-minute sustained (SSHWS/NWS)
- Highest winds: 140 mph (220 km/h)
- Lowest pressure: 948 mbar (hPa); 27.99 inHg

Overall effects
- Fatalities: None reported
- Damage: Minimal
- Areas affected: Cape Verde Islands
- IBTrACS
- Part of the 2010 Atlantic hurricane season

Hurricane Julia was the easternmost Category 4 hurricane recorded in the Atlantic basin since reliable satellite observations became available. The twelfth tropical cyclone, fifth hurricane and fourth major hurricane of the 2010 Atlantic hurricane season, Julia rapidly developed on September 12 from a tropical wave near Cape Verde. Passing near the islands, the system quickly organized into Tropical Storm Julia the next day. On September 14, Julia attained hurricane status and subsequently entered a trend of rapid intensification; the storm strengthened from a minimal hurricane to a low-end Category 4 in only 24 hours. After peaking in intensity, further development was impeded as interaction with nearby Hurricane Igor began to occur; the storm was downgraded to a tropical storm by September 18. It subsequently moved into a region of unfavorable conditions, heading toward lower sea surface temperatures. Correspondingly, Julia entered an extratropical transition on September 20, and advisories on the storm were discontinued by that time.

As Julia never posed any significant threat to land, damage related to the storm was minimal. Trace amounts of rain reportedly fell across the Cape Verde islands, causing locally light flooding and minor inconveniences. Gusts battering the territory peaked at 30 mph (48 km/h), resulting in some wind damage to crops. In addition, these winds produced rough sea conditions, and high waves posed few threats along coastlines.

== Meteorological history ==
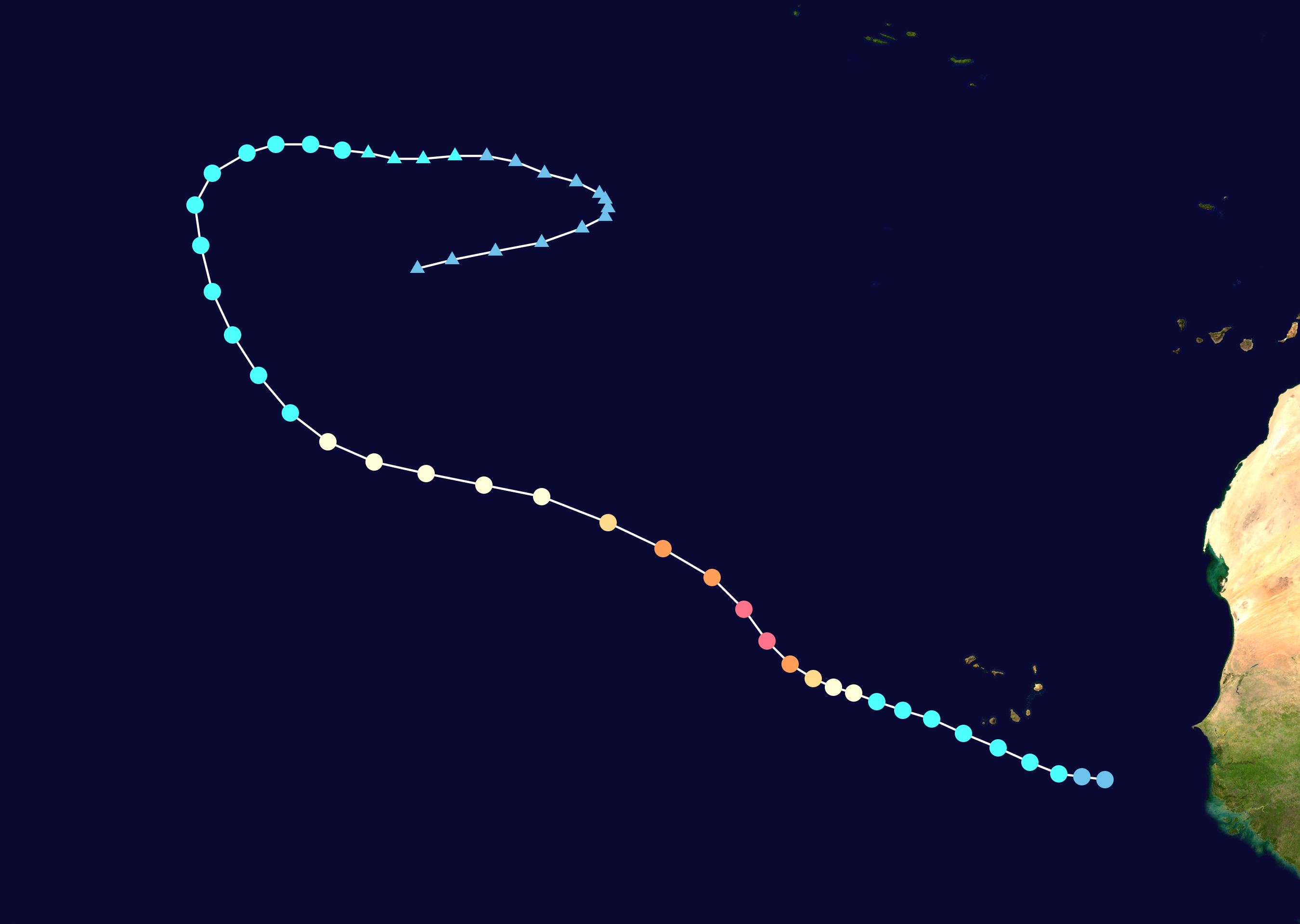
Map plotting the storm's track and intensity, according to the Saffir–Simpson scale Map key Saffir–Simpson scale Tropical depression (≤38 mph, ≤62 km/h) Tropical storm (39–73 mph, 63–118 km/h) Category 1 (74–95 mph, 119–153 km/h) Category 2 (96–110 mph, 154–177 km/h) Category 3 (111–129 mph, 178–208 km/h) Category 4 (130–156 mph, 209–251 km/h) Category 5 (≥157 mph, ≥252 km/h) Unknown Storm type Tropical cyclone Subtropical cyclone Extratropical cyclone, remnant low, tropical disturbance, or monsoon depression

The origins of Julia trace back to a vigorous tropical wave, or an equatorward low-pressure area, which emerged into the Atlantic along the western coast of Africa on September 11. At the time, the system maintained deep convection and strong easterly winds, prompting the National Hurricane Center (NHC) to commence tracking the system as an area of interest. As the wave moved generally westward at 10 to 15 mph (16 to 24 km/h), a quick increase in organization as well as a significant drop in surface pressure became notable. The system continued to organize, and several hours later, the NHC noted only a slight increase would suffice for the development of a tropical cyclone. By September 12, a tropical depression developed, and the NHC initiated advisories at 1500 UTC that day. At the time, the cyclone was situated 250 mi (400 km) southeast of the southernmost islands of Cape Verde.

For several hours, steady strengthening continued as the depression maintained a westward track. Operationally, it was upgraded to Tropical Storm Julia early on September 13, though post-analysis confirmed the storm had reached winds of 40 mph (64 km/h) twelve hours after formation. For several hours, no significant change occurred in its intensity or organization as Julia passed near Cape Verde, though the storm gradually retraced to the west-northwest along the southern periphery of a deep-layer ridge. Slow intensification resumed as the storm bypassed the Cape Verde islands; by early September 14, it displayed a ragged, banded eye-like feature in satellite imagery. Due to locally high sea surface temperatures of about 28 °C (82 °F), a period of rapid intensification subsequently commenced; within hours, Julia attained Category 1 hurricane status. Though located over an area with relatively low oceanic heat content, Julia continued to intensify rapidly under low vertical wind shear and over favorable sea surface temperatures; as such, the hurricane was upgraded to Category 2 status on September 15. In less than two hours, the hurricane deepened to reach Category 3 intensity, becoming the fourth major hurricane of the season. The rapid intensification trend continued, and Julia eventually strengthened into a Category 4 hurricane six hours later. Based on satellite estimates, its winds peaked at 140 mph (230 km/h) and a minimum barometric pressure of 948 mbar (hPa; 27.99 inHg), though operationally estimated at 135 mph (217 km/h) and 950 mbar (950 hPa; 28 inHg), respectively.

Upon peaking in intensity, Julia accelerated slightly as it re-curved toward the northwest along a mid to upper-level low to its southwest. In addition, this system generated unfavorable southerly flow aloft, inducing a slight weakening of the storm. By early September 16, Julia's eye became indistinguishable on satellite images, and the storm further dropped to below major hurricane status. Upon doing so, Julia became embedded within a south-southeasterly steering current along deep-layer ridging in its vicinity, resulting in a more westward track. Though still a hurricane, the relatively small tropical system moved to the east of the much larger Hurricane Igor. Concurrently, Igor's outflow began impinging on Julia's circulation, and due to colder sea surface temperatures, the storm weakened below hurricane intensity late on September 17. Henceforth, Julia re-accelerated as it further curved northward around the contiguous ridge, nearly merging with Igor as a result. Progressively tracking to the north over the next hours, Julia subsequently executed a turn to the northeast, then to the east. Proceeding eastward, the low-level center of the storm became partially exposed on September 18; however, for several hours thereafter, convection gradually redeveloped over its center. Despite the deep convection, vertical wind shear again increased over the system, causing the storm to enter an extratropical transition. It is estimated Julia degenerated into a post-tropical low by 1800 UTC on September 20, while located about 1,095 mi (1,762 km) west of the Azores. The resultant storm meandered around over the Atlantic for several days, continuing generally eastward before executing an elongated loop to the south. Following this erratic track, the remnants of Hurricane Julia proceeded northwestward and came within 350 mi (560 km) of Bermuda, where they were once again briefly monitored by the NHC. However, chance of redevelopment dwindled, as conditions were not conducive for tropical formation; convection nearly diminished entirely, and the NHC discontinued monitoring the system on September 28.

== Preparations and impact ==
Hurricanes Karl (left), Igor (middle) and Julia (right) on September 16

Immediately upon developing into a tropical depression, Julia posed a threat to Cape Verde. At the time, at least 3 to 5 in (76 to 127 mm) of precipitation was expected, with locally accumulations of up to 8 inches (200 mm). In response, the Government of Cape Verde issued a tropical storm warning for the southern portion of the archipelago, which included Maio, Sao Tiago, Fogo, and Brava. The tropical storm warning remained in effect after Julia intensified into a tropical storm; it was finally discontinued early on September 14.

Since Julia stayed at sea and never directly struck land as a significant cyclone, there were no reports of major damage or casualties. Across southern Cape Verde, intermittent rains and some gusty winds were reported when the storm neared the islands. Winds reached between 24 and 30 mph (39 and 48 km/h); the only known report of rainfall accumulations was in Sal, where no more than 0.39 in (9.9 mm) of precipitation was recorded. During the passage of the storm, authorities canceled several local and international flights across Cape Verde. In Sao Tiago, floods triggered several landslides, resulting in the isolation of the community of Covão Grande from roadways. Several communities also reported wind damage to maiz crops. In addition, rough seas with waves of 9.8 to 14.8 ft (3.0 to 4.5 m) resulted in minor disruptions along coastlines.

== See also ==
- List of Category 4 Atlantic hurricanes
- Hurricane Igor – another Category 4 hurricane that co-existed with Julia
- Hurricane Fred (2009) – another major hurricane that formed unusually far east
- Hurricane Frances (1980) - another eastern-forming major hurricane
- Hurricane Lorenzo (2019) – the easternmost Category 5 Atlantic hurricane on record
