= Limón, Honduras =

Limón
- Municipality
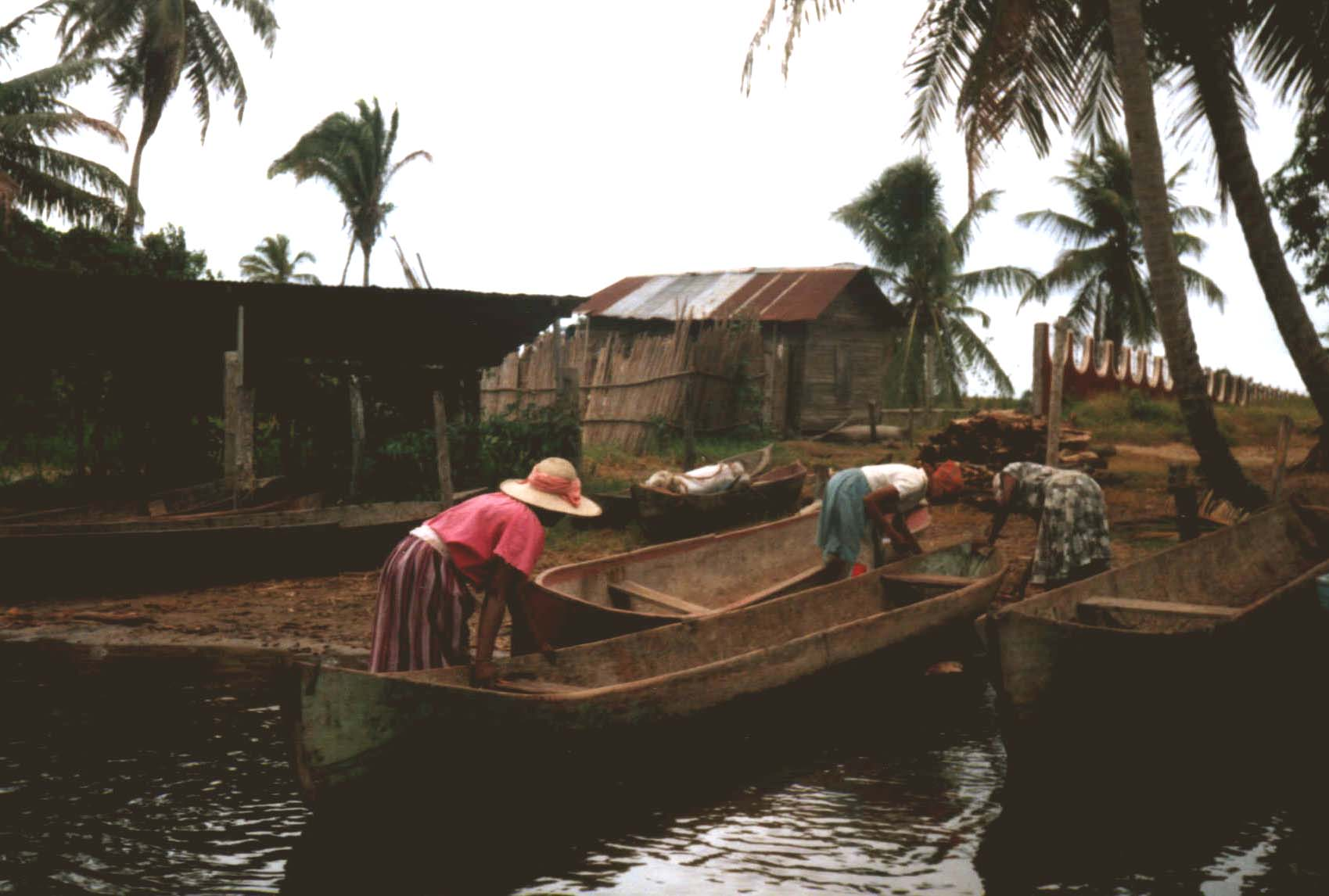
- Women in Limón, 1994

- Location in Honduras
- Coordinates: 15°51′45″N 85°30′00″W
- Country: Honduras
- Department: Colón

Area
  - Total: 598 km^{2} (231 sq mi)
- Elevation: 3 m (9.8 ft)

Population (2015)
  - Total: 14,421
  - Density: 24.1/km^{2} (62.5/sq mi)

Limón is a municipality in the department of Colón in Honduras.

According to official census of 2001, has a population of 8,627 inhabitants. Its territory of 643.4 square kilometres (248.4 sq mi) is divided into an aldea (village) and 23 caseríos (hamlets). Limón is bordered to the north by the Caribbean Sea, to the south and east by the municipality of Iriona, and to the west by the municipalities of Trujillo and Santa Rosa de Aguan.

== See also ==
- Real Bella Vista
