= Cyclone Sose =

Category 2 South Pacific cyclone in 2001

Tropical Cyclone Sose
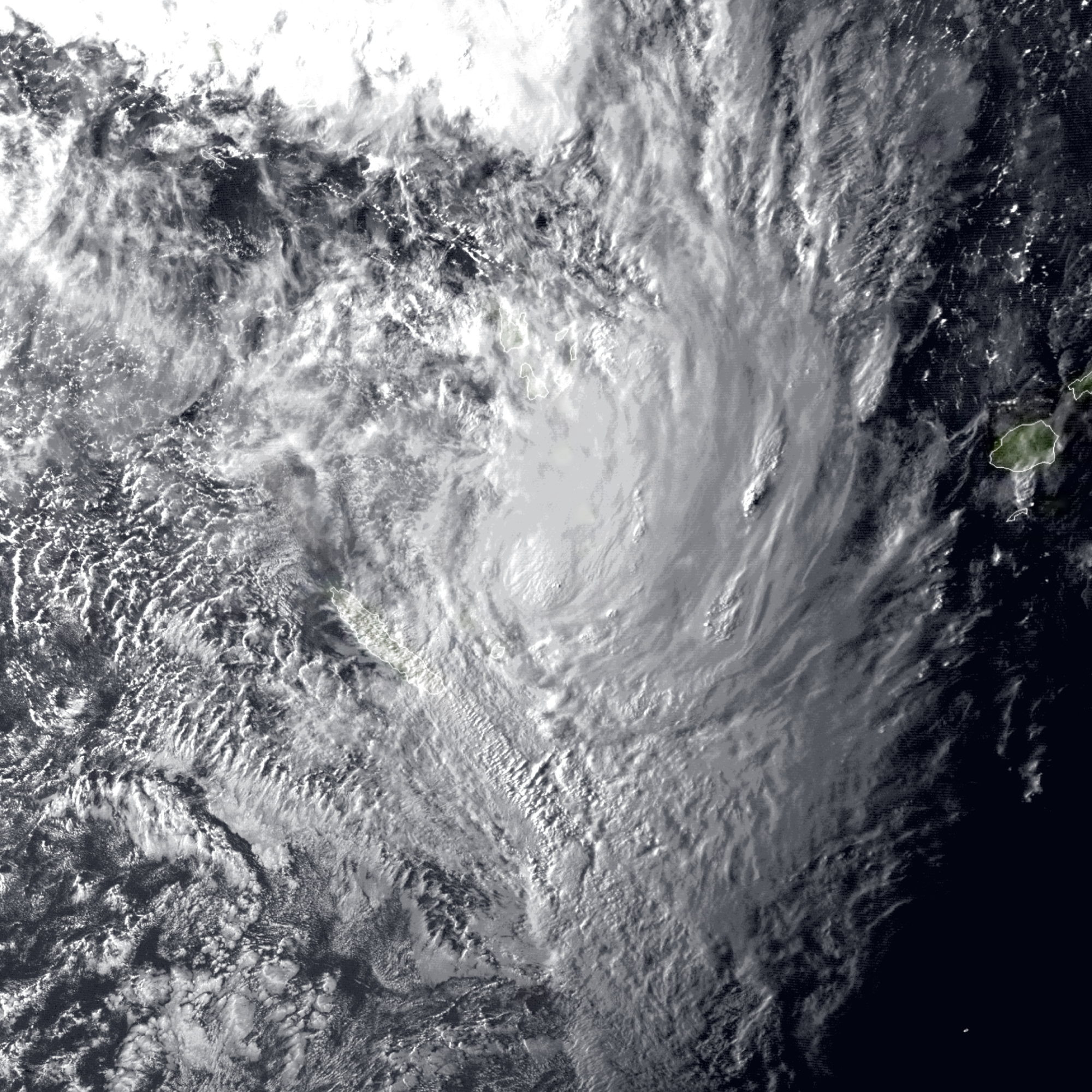
- Cyclone Sose near its peak intensity on 7 April

Meteorological history
- Formed: 5 April 2001
- Dissipated: 12 April 2001

Category 2 tropical cyclone
- 10-minute sustained (FMS)
- Highest winds: 110 km/h (70 mph)
- Highest gusts: 165 km/h (105 mph)
- Lowest pressure: 975 hPa (mbar); 28.79 inHg

Category 1-equivalent tropical cyclone
- 1-minute sustained (SSHWS/JTWC)
- Highest winds: 130 km/h (80 mph)

Overall effects
- Fatalities: 9
- Areas affected: Vanuatu; New Caledonia; New Zealand; Australia; Tonga; Samoa
- IBTrACS
- Part of the 2000–01 South Pacific cyclone season

Tropical Cyclone Sose was a moderate storm system that chiefly impacted the island nation of Vanuatu in early April 2001. The developing cyclone was first detected on 3 April, while situated well to the northeast of Vanuatu. As atmospheric conditions became more conducive to intensification, the disturbance gradually consolidated as it drifted toward the west-southwest. After receiving the name Sose on 5 April, the cyclone was driven southeastward, passing just west of Espiritu Santo and neighboring islands. Although it never made landfall, Sose was particularly expansive, producing a wide area of gale-force winds. The cyclone peaked in strength between 7 and 8 April with maximum 10-minute sustained winds of 110 km/h (68 mph) and 1-minute sustained winds of 130 km/h (81 mph), placing it at Category 2 intensity on the Australian tropical cyclone intensity scale. Ultimately, stronger wind shear and an increasingly hostile upper-air pattern took their toll on the cyclone as it progressed due south; Sose lost tropical characteristics to the northeast of Norfolk Island by 12 April. The extratropical remnants of Sose continued into the Tasman Sea.

Occurring just two months after Cyclone Paula affected Vanuatu, Sose compounded the damage already done by the previous storm, especially to crops and farmlands. Throughout the island chain, two people died to the storm. Roadways were blocked by debris and floodwaters, while schools and classrooms on several islands were damaged or ruined. The storm destroyed about 200 homes around the nation and damaged many more, particularly on southern Espiritu Santo. The storm's large fetch generated enormous swells as far away as Australia's Eastern Seaboard, where surfers took advantage of the abnormally intense conditions and two swimmers drowned. On Maré Island in New Caledonia, a man was swept away by a large wave and presumed dead. The storm later produced torrential rainfall and strong winds over the North Island of New Zealand, sparking damaging freshwater floods and downing trees and power lines. Hazardous driving conditions in the Waikato region led to a fatal traffic accident in which three people died. Another individual drowned in a swollen river. Sose reportedly contributed to coastal flooding as far away as Tonga. In all, Sose killed nine people; total monetary damage is unknown. As a result of the storm's destruction, its name was later retired.

== Meteorological history ==
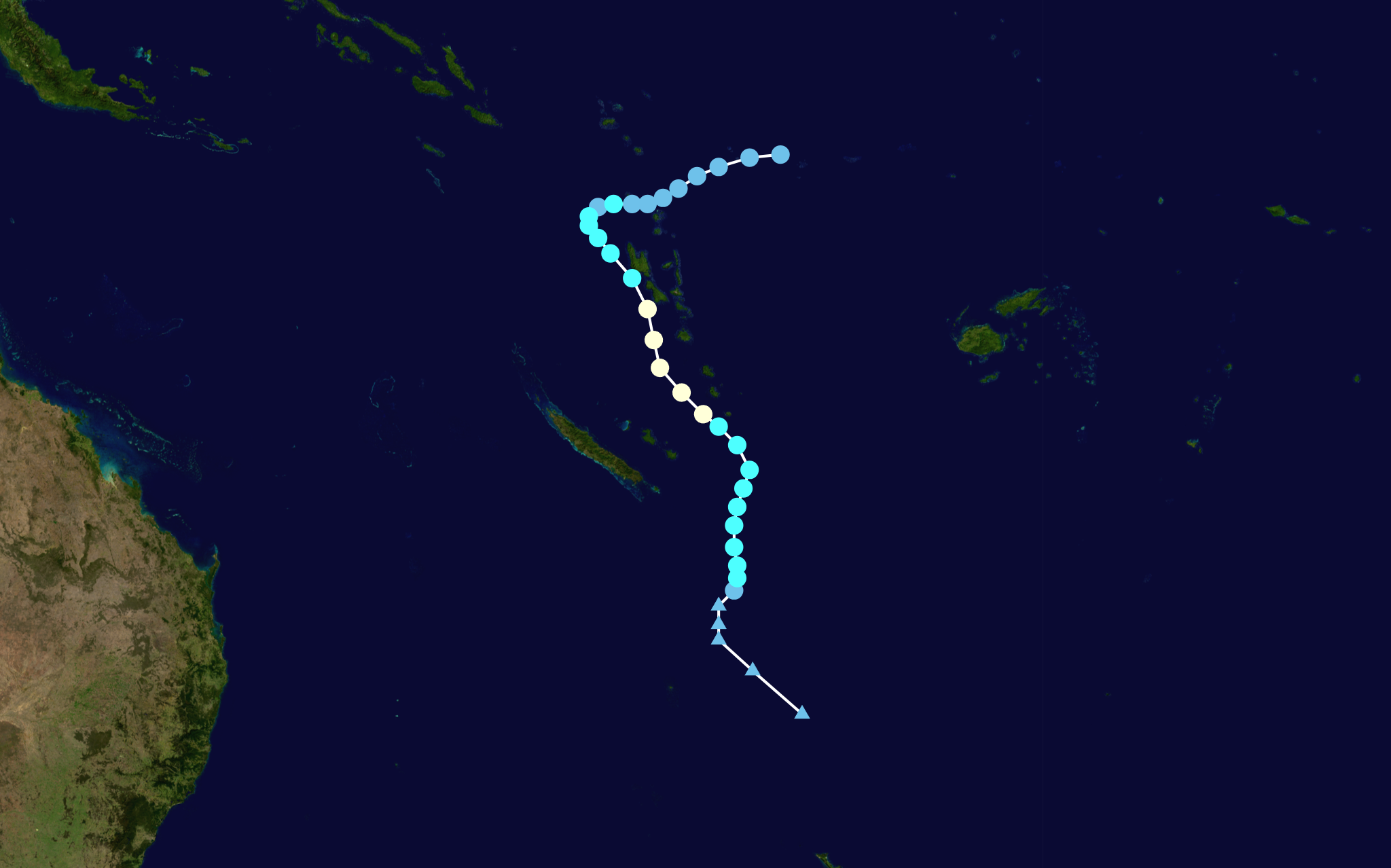
Map plotting the storm's track and intensity, according to the Saffir–Simpson scale Map key Saffir–Simpson scale Tropical depression (≤38 mph, ≤62 km/h) Tropical storm (39–73 mph, 63–118 km/h) Category 1 (74–95 mph, 119–153 km/h) Category 2 (96–110 mph, 154–177 km/h) Category 3 (111–129 mph, 178–208 km/h) Category 4 (130–156 mph, 209–251 km/h) Category 5 (≥157 mph, ≥252 km/h) Unknown Storm type Tropical cyclone Subtropical cyclone Extratropical cyclone, remnant low, tropical disturbance, or monsoon depression

Cyclone Sose originated in a broad area of disturbed weather first identified on 3 April, well to the east-northeast of Vanuatu. The system initially drifted generally toward the west under an improving upper-level wind shear pattern that began to catalyze favorable outflow. Late on 4 April, the Joint Typhoon Warning Center (JTWC) issued a Tropical Cyclone Formation Alert on the disturbance, noting strong banding features and a well-defined low-level center of circulation. Tropical Depression 13F formed at 1200 UTC next day as examined by the Fiji Meteorological Service (FMS), the local Regional Specialized Meteorological Center. At the time, the new cyclone was situated about 140 km (87 mi) to the northwest of Espiritu Santo. The JTWC's official "best track" entry on the storm—designated 19P—first lists it as a tropical depression at 1800 UTC on 4 April, though operationally, the agency did not issue its first tropical cyclone warning until late on 5 April. The storm proceeded slowly westward and gradually continued to organize, its intensification hindered by residual wind shear and its proximity to the mountainous terrain of Espiritu Santo. However, convection over the center continued to develop, and consequently the FMS upgraded 13F to Tropical Cyclone Sose at 1800 UTC.

Sose remained nearly stationary for a period of 24 hours, blocked by a strong subtropical ridge to the south. Over the course of 6 April, an approaching mid-level trough of low pressure created a weakness in the ridge, allowing Sose to accelerate southeastward. The storm's environment steadily improved in both the lower and upper levels, triggering the consolidation of deep convection around the center. As a result, early on 7 April, a central dense overcast formed. According to the FMS, Sose reached its peak strength at 1800 UTC, with maximum 10-minute sustained winds of 110 km/h (68 mph) and a central barometric pressure of 975 hPa (28.8 inHg). The cyclone passed just to the west of the islands of Vanuatu as its outer bands contracted around the well-defined central dense overcast. A large feeder band persisted on the eastern side of the circulation, bridging the northwestern southeastern quadrants. The feature became a notable aspect of the cyclone's satellite presentation. The JTWC estimated that 19P reached its peak intensity at 1200 UTC on 8 April, possessing 1-minute sustained winds of 130 km/h (81 mph) and gusts up to 170 km/h (110 mph). The Tropical Rainfall Measuring Mission imaged the storm shortly thereafter, and revealed a distinct eye about 44 km (27 mi) across, bounded on the southern semicircle by strong convection activity.

Sose made its closest approach to New Caledonia early on 8 April, passing about 280 km (170 mi) to the northeast. A strong area of high pressure over New Zealand served to tighten to surface pressure gradient well to the south of Sose's center, contributing to an overall very large envelope of gale-force winds. In turn, the cyclone affected numerous islands on both side of its path, despite never having made landfall. As it progressed on its southeastward track, the cyclone began to show signs of weakening, at least partially due to increasing wind shear from an approaching upper trough. At the same time, a mid-level ridge to the east forced the storm to turn due south; the conflicting wind patterns undermined the cyclone's circulation, causing its center at the surface to separate from the deep convection. Both the FMS and the JTWC reflected steady weakening, and by early on 10 April, the center had become exposed and ill-defined. Sose then entered the area of responsibility of the Tropical Cyclone Warning Center in Wellington, New Zealand, where it continued to deteriorate. The JTWC issued its last warning on 19P at 0600 UTC on 11 April, while the system was located about 335 km (208 mi) northeast of Norfolk Island. TCWC Wellington soon downgraded Sose to a tropical depression as it underwent an extratropical transition. Drifting south-southwestward, the cyclone lost its tropical identity early on 12 April. The remnant low ultimately moved over the Tasman Sea, where it was absorbed by a broad low pressure system about to travel over New Zealand's North Island. Abundant residual tropical moisture acted on the low pressure environment to create widespread precipitation across northern New Zealand.

== Impact and aftermath ==
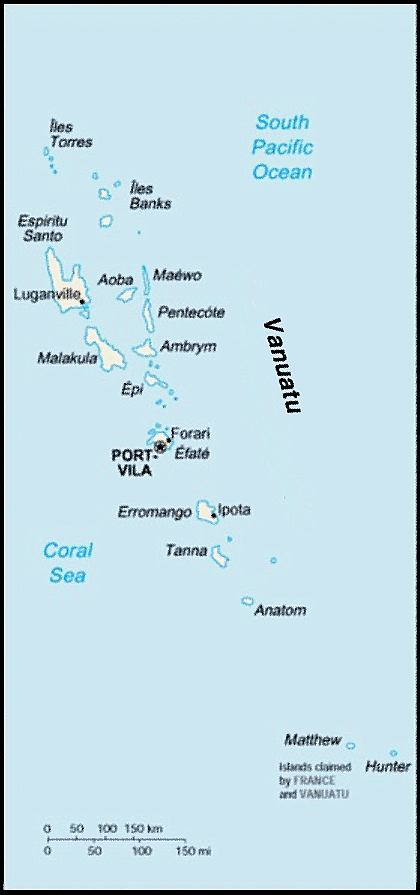
Annotated map of Vanuatu; click to enlarge

Prior to the storm's passage of New Caledonia, residents there were advised to take basic precautions, such as remaining indoors during bouts of inclement weather. Storm warnings were hoisted over the Loyalty Islands and South Province. Vanuatu's Department of Meteorology began posting official alerts on 7 April. Warnings for heavy rains and strong winds were posted throughout northern New Zealand in anticipation of the storm's remnants. With Easter weekend, more motorists were already expected to be traveling longer distances, and officials grew concerned of dangerous effects on traffic from the cyclone. Police increased their presence to unprecedented levels in an attempt to control speeding and other hazardous behaviors.

Due to the storm's "negative impact on one or more countries", Sose was retired from the cyclical list of tropical cyclone names; and was replaced with Sarai.

=== Vanuatu ===
Sose predominately affected the western islands of Vanuatu, starting from the north. Most severely impacted were the islands of Espiritu Santo, Malakula, Aoba, Efate, Erromango, Tanna, Aneityum, and the Shepherd Islands. In several locations, Sose compounded or worsened the destruction wrought by Cyclone Paula in late February and early March. The storm produced significant precipitation, heavy seas, and sustained winds exceeding 100 km/h (62 mph).

A resident of Malakula was struck and killed by a falling coconut while seeking shelter from the worsening conditions. Agriculture on nearby Ahamb Island, already impaired by Paula, was further compromised; all crops, both those remaining after Paula and those planted in the intervening time, were destroyed. Four classrooms on the small island were also damaged beyond use. Buildings on Aoba incurred appreciable damage, while on Efate, the storm brought down utility poles, severely damaged local schools, and left roads covered with debris and floodwaters. Flooding in the nation's capital city of Port Vila forced 50 residents to leave their homes in search of higher ground. Espiritu Santo, particularly the island's south shore around Luganville, bore the brunt of Cyclone Sose. Several types of crops (also weakened by Paula) took a heavy beating, and 60 people had to evacuate due to encroaching floods. In total, the storm demolished 59 houses on the island and in some way damaged another 101. A young child drowned after being swept away while attempting to cross a swollen waterway. Just offshore, the M/V Omale succumbed to the heavy seas; all 16 of its occupants successfully swam four hours to shore.

Overall, the Vanuatu National Disaster Management Office estimated at least 50% each of food crops and buildings in the hardest-hit provinces were left in a state of damage. The United Nations Office for the Coordination of Humanitarian Affairs considered about 200 residences throughout the island nation "lost" to the storm. The National Disaster Committee met on 9 April to discuss potential emergency aid for residents of the areas hardest hit by cyclones Sose and Paula. Around the same time, the Vanuatu Red Cross stated that it would distribute supplies such as materials for makeshift shelters and water purification tablets. The Red Cross was also to provide 500 bags of rice to villages in the Shepherd Islands. Political unrest on a national level limited the government's attention to initial recovery; it did not immediate declare a state of emergency or file any requests for international aid.

=== New Zealand and Australia ===
The remnants of Cyclone Sose were a significant factor in stormy weather experienced over the North Island of New Zealand between 12 and 14 April. Numerous locations received 10 to 20 cm (4 to 8 in) of rainfall, and 23.0 cm (9.1 in) of precipitation fell at Glenbervie, Northland region, in just seven hours. The heavy rainfall rates caused "significant" flooding of low-lying roads and farmlands in the region. Floodwaters inundated the township of Kaeo and entered several local businesses. The swollen Kaeo River temporarily rendered New Zealand State Highway 10 impassable to most vehicles at a bridge over the waterway. A hospital became isolated from the rest of the town. Further to the west, State Highway 1 was blocked by flooding at Rangiahua, as was State Highway 2 between Te Puke and Te Maunga Junction. At the former, the rains triggered a landslide and polluted the local supply of drinking water. Several residences throughout the region sustained damage. A 22-year-old man drowned in high waters along the Wairoa River. Rising waters from the Kerikeri River threatened to affect the Mission House, the nation's oldest surviving building, where staff were on standby to relocate furnishings if necessary.

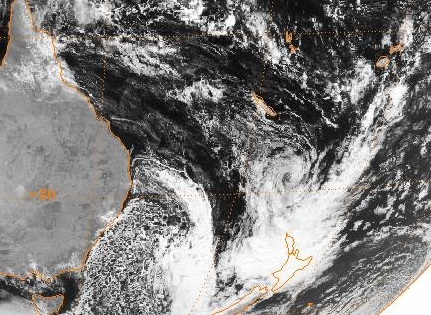
Satellite image, taken at 0000 UTC on 12 April, of the weakening tropical cyclone as it approached the North Island of New Zealand

A severe traffic accident occurred on State Highway 28 at Tapapa, Waikato, on the morning of 13 April. The head-on collision was attributed to slick roads resulting from the storm. Three individuals were killed and two more were hospitalized. Several other accidents were reported around the same time. In addition to the rainfall, strong winds brought down trees and utility poles across the island and as far south as Marlborough on the South Island. There, the strong winds fanned a large fire ignited by sparks from downed power lines. The fire covered more than 70 hectares (175 acres) of land and prompted several families to evacuate their homes. Three people were injured at Ohakune after a temporary tent collapsed at a local festival. Along the coast, swells triggered by Sose reached 3.5 m (11 ft) in height.

The tight pressure gradient between Cyclone Sose and the ridge to its south generated extremely rough seas along the eastern coast of Australia, especially Queensland. Along the state's southern shore, normally protected from strong swells, waves were as high as 8 m (26 ft) and frequently between 4–5 m (13–16 ft). A 53-year-old man and his 9-year-old son both drowned in the heavy surf near Gladstone on 8 April. Offshore Kingscliff, New South Wales, a yacht capsized, forcing its two occupants to swim to land. The large swells proved popular with experienced surfers looking for a challenge. Although the event became infamous within local surfing circles, at least one surfer was hospitalized after being swept against rocks, and several others required rescue. Some beach erosion was reported in several locations, leading to minor sandbagging efforts to hamper the erosion.

=== Elsewhere ===
A large wave breaking on the cliffs of Maré Island in New Caledonia swept away a spectator, who was presumed dead after the rough conditions delayed searching efforts. The storm disrupted classes and school activities in parts of the archipelago, but little to no damage was reported.

The distant cyclone sent large swells toward Tonga and Samoa, coinciding with high astronomical tides. Coastal flooding on low-lying islands of Tonga reportedly destroyed houses and crops.

== See also ==
- Tropical cyclones in 2001
- Cyclone Bola (1988) – among the costliest cyclones in the history of New Zealand
- Cyclone Frank (1999) – tropical cyclone which struck New Caledonia about two years prior
- Cyclone Waka (2001–2002) – one of the most destructive tropical cyclones ever to affect the South Pacific Kingdom of Tonga, occurring eight months after Sose
