= Death by coconut =

Cause of death

Bilingual warning sign in Honolulu, written in English and Japanese

Coconuts falling from their trees and striking individuals can cause serious injury to the back, neck, shoulders and head. These injuries are occasionally fatal.

Following a 1984 study on "Injuries Due to Falling Coconuts", exaggerated claims spread concerning the number of deaths by falling coconuts. Falling coconuts, according to urban legend, kill a few people a year. This legend gained momentum after the 2002 work of a noted expert on shark attacks was characterized as saying that falling coconuts kill 150 people each year worldwide. This statistic has often been contrasted with the number of shark-caused deaths per year, which is around five.

Concern about the risk of fatality due to falling coconuts led local officials in Queensland, Australia, to remove coconut trees from beaches in 2002. One newspaper dubbed coconuts "the killer fruit". Historical reports of actual death by coconut date back to the 1770s.

Death by coconut can also occur as sudden cardiac death caused by hyperkalemia after consuming moderate to large quantities of coconut water, due to its high potassium level. Although rare, cases have also been reported of anaphylaxis among patients with a food allergy to coconut.

== Background ==
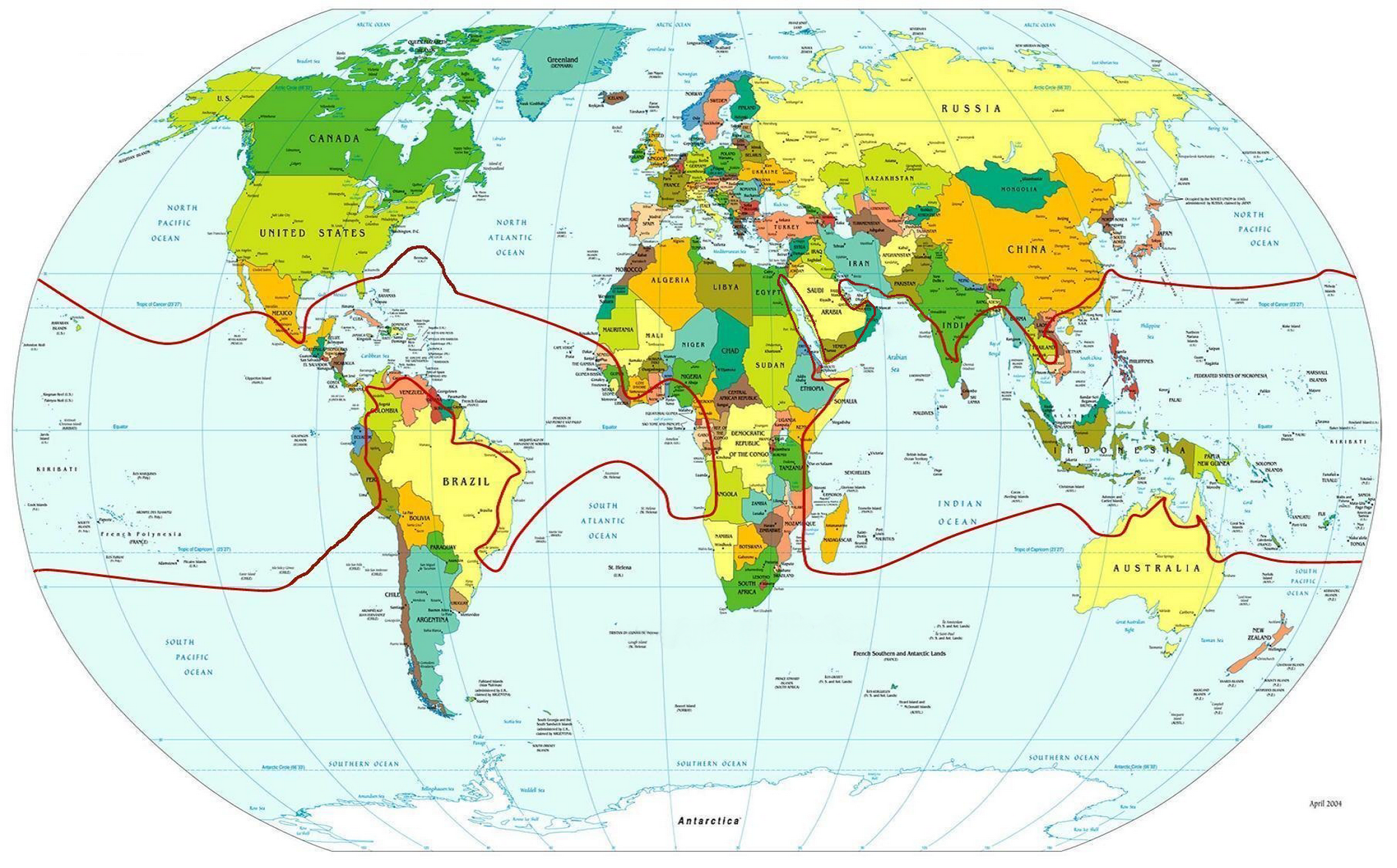
The range of the natural habitat of the coconut palm tree delineated by the red line (based on information in Werth 1933)

The coconut fruit comes from the coconut palm (Cocos nucifera), which can grow up to 30 m (100 ft) tall, with pinnate leaves 4–6 m (13–20 ft) long and pinnae 60–90 cm (2–3 ft) long. Older leaves will break away cleanly from the tree leaving a smooth trunk. While a mature and thriving tree can yield up to 75 fruits per year, it is more common to get fewer than 30. A full-sized coconut weighs about 1.44 kg (3 lb 3 oz). Coconut palms are cultivated in more than 80 countries, with a total production of 61 million tonnes per year.

The origin of the death by coconut legend was a 1984 research paper by Dr. Peter Barss, of Provincial Hospital, Alotau, Milne Bay Province, Papua New Guinea, titled "Injuries Due to Falling Coconuts", published in The Journal of Trauma (now known as The Journal of Trauma and Acute Care Surgery). In his paper, Barss observed that in Papua New Guinea, where he was based, over a period of four years, 2.5% of trauma admissions were for those injured by falling coconuts. None were fatal, but he mentioned two anecdotal reports of deaths, one several years before. That figure of two deaths went on to be misquoted as 150 worldwide, based on the assumption that other places would have a similar rate of falling coconut deaths. In October 2001, Barss received an "Ig Nobel Award" from the Annals of Improbable Research in recognition of research that "cannot or should not be replicated". In response to the dubious distinction, Barss told the Canadian Medical Association Journal, "When you're treating these injuries daily, it's not funny at all".

Following the publication of Barss' study, exaggerated claims about the number of deaths by coconut began to spread. Reports of death by coconut became so widespread that The Straight Dope, a newspaper column devoted to exposing myths, reported that it had become an urban legend. Another writer, Joel Best, described the claim of widespread deaths as a "journalistic equivalent of a contemporary legend". An analysis by the Shark Research Institute cites a press release from Club Travel, a UK-based travel insurance company, as helping to spread the urban legend. In an attempt to market travel insurance to individuals traveling to Papua New Guinea, the release stated that coconuts were "ten times more dangerous than sharks". In May 2002, the legend gained new momentum when George H. Burgess, director of the International Shark Attack File, claimed that "[f]alling coconuts kill 150 people worldwide each year".

Concerns about death by coconut have been reported extensively in mainstream media sources. Such reports include:

- In February 1985, The New York Times reported on the hazards posed by coconut trees and noted that "falling coconuts could strike a person on the ground with a force of almost 2,000 pounds [9 kilonewtons]".
- In August 2001, the Toledo Blade reported that "a check with the experts" found that a human was more likely to be killed by a pig or a falling coconut than by "a shark on the prowl for dinner".
- In February 2002, The Daily Telegraph reported that coconut trees were being removed from beaches in Queensland, Australia, to guard against "death by coconut".
- In April 2002, the Boston Herald ran an op-ed piece titled "Travelers should watch out for coconuts – the killer fruit". The piece reported on the removal of palm trees bearing coconuts in Queensland and noted that local officials were "advising campers not to pitch their tents under coconut trees".
- In June 2002, The New York Times reported Burgess's claim that "the chances of being killed by a shark are less than those of being killed by a coconut that falls from a tree".
- In March 2003, The Morning Call in Pennsylvania reported, "You are 30 times more likely to be killed by a falling coconut than by a shark".
- In July 2005, Richard Roeper in the Chicago Sun-Times cited a 2001 report from The Times for the proposition that, "You're more likely to be killed by a falling coconut than a shark".
- In February 2009, CBS News reported, "You have a better chance of being killed by a falling coconut than by a shark".
- Following shark sightings off the Massachusetts coast, The Boston Globe in September 2009 quoted a local resident as saying, "You're less likely to get killed by a shark than by a coconut falling on your head".
- In November 2010, The Guardian reported that the Indian government removed coconuts from the trees at Mumbai's Gandhi museum "for fear that a nut would descend on to the head of President Obama" who had recently visited the city. The article cited the Barss study and observed, "Thanks to Indian officials and perhaps also to Barss, Obama's recent visit to Mumbai was devoid of coconut trauma".
- In October 2011, the Australian Broadcasting Corporation broadcast a story in which Christopher Neff from the University of Sydney claimed that "while people may not pay attention to the statistics, you are more likely to be killed by a coconut than eaten by a shark".

A later 2001 study over a five-year period found that all skull fractures from falling fruit were in children under the age of ten.

== Documented occurrences ==
=== Death by falling coconut ===
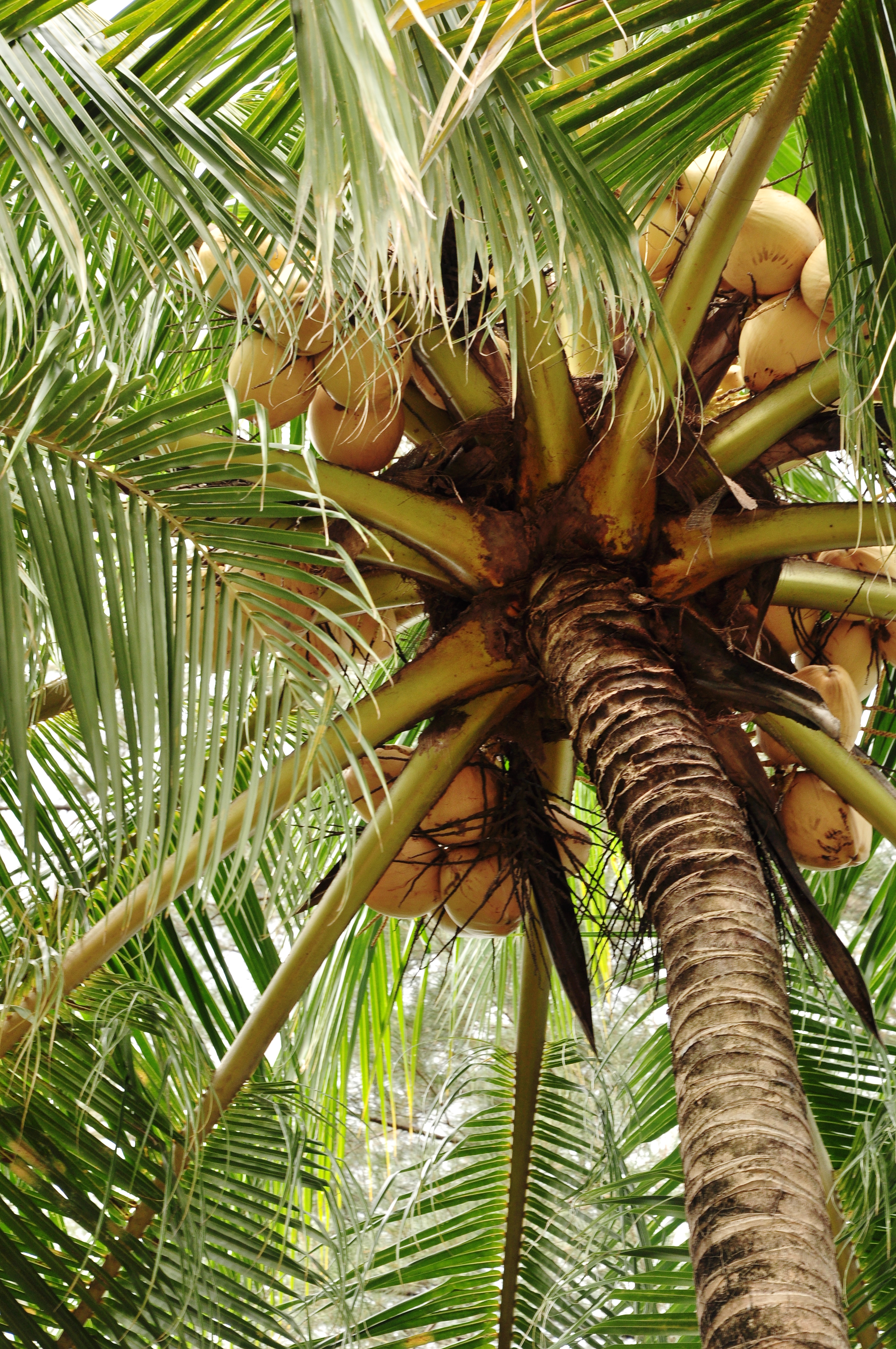
Coconuts on tree near Cancún, Mexico

Documented instances of death by coconut include:

- In approximately 1777, King Tetui of Mangaia in the Cook Islands had a concubine who died after being struck by "a falling green nut".
- In 1833, four people died from falling coconuts on the island of Sri Lanka.
- In January 1943, a US Marine was killed in his sleep when struck in the head by a falling coconut near Henderson Field on Guadalcanal.
- On 26 August 1946, Romualdo Maldonado, age 99, was killed by a blow from a falling coconut in Panama.
- On 4 February 1952, Teluk Anson, a coconut picker, was killed by a falling coconut in Malaya.
- On 26 August 1952, a seven-month-old baby died when she was struck in the head by a coconut while being held by her mother outside Butterworth, Penang.
- In 1966, a resident of Rabaul, Papua New Guinea, was killed while eating lunch beneath a coconut tree when struck in the face by a falling coconut.
- On 27 July 1973, a two-year-old girl was killed and her aunt injured during a family picnic at Kapiolani Beach Center near Diamond Head, Hawaii, when a cluster of 57 coconuts weighing more than 45 kg (100 lb) fell from a tree. The incident was "Hawaii's first recorded fatality from falling coconuts".
- In November 1991, a mourner was killed by a falling coconut while attending a funeral at a cemetery in southern Sri Lanka.
- In April 2001, a resident of Vanuatu was killed by a falling coconut while seeking shelter from adverse weather conditions relating to Cyclone Sose.
- On 13 August 2001, in northeastern Kelantan, Malaysia, 59-year-old Mamat Kundur was killed when a monkey used to harvest coconuts from trees dropped a coconut on his head.
- On 1 August 2002, in Raub, Pahang, Malaysia, 6-month-old Nurul Emilia Zulaika Nasaruddin died after a coconut fell into the child's crib and struck the child.
- On 22 September 2003, also in Raub, Pahang, Malaysia, 65-year-old Deraman Ghomat was waiting to catch a bus. After the wind became stronger and rain started to fall, a coconut fell and killed him.
- In March 2009, 48-year-old Luelit Janchoom, in Nakhon Si Thammarat Province of Thailand, was killed when a monkey used to harvest coconuts furiously kicked them down to his master, hitting his head.
- In May 2010, a one-and-a-half-month-old girl was killed when a falling coconut struck her in the head during a religious ceremony outside the family's home in Thiruvananthapuram, India.
- In August 2010, a 69-year-old man was killed by a coconut that fell out of a 12-meter (39 ft) palm tree as he sat in a rocking chair outside his home in Melgar, Colombia.
- In 2013, a man in Colombo, Sri Lanka, was killed after a coconut fell on his head.
- In September 2014, a 54-year-old English teacher was killed by a falling coconut in Pitigala, Sri Lanka.
- On January 5, 2016, a 16-year-old schoolgirl from Yakkalamulla, Sri Lanka, died due to an injury caused by a coconut falling on her head.
- On October 16, 2016, a farmer was killed by a falling coconut in Divulapitiya, Sri Lanka.
- In May 2017, a 59-year-old man was killed by a falling coconut while trying to pick coconuts from a tree in Jempol District, Malaysia.
- In June 2021, an 11-month-old boy was killed by a falling coconut in Haunsabhavi, Karnataka, India.
- In August 2021, a 20-year-old man in Tandag, Philippines, was killed after four coconuts hit him during the magnitude 7.1 Davao Oriental earthquake. He was the only casualty of the earthquake.
- In July 2022, a 30-year-old woman was killed by a falling coconut while washing dishes outside in Ottapalam, Kerala, India.
- In December 2022, a 49-year-old man died the day after he was hit by a falling coconut in Kozhikode, India.
- In February 2023, a farmer in Belthangady, Karnataka, India, was killed when a coconut fell on his head while he was picking coconuts.
- In October 2023, an imam in Jempol District, Malaysia, died after being hit by a falling coconut.
- On 18 June 2024, an 11-month-old girl lost her life after a coconut fell on her head in Deltota, Sri Lanka.
- On January 9, 2025, a 48-year-old man died after being struck on the head by a falling coconut in Raigad, Maharashtra, India.
- On August 16, 2025, a 2-year-old child from Wennappuwa, Sri Lanka, died after being struck on the head by a falling coconut.

=== Variations ===
While the typical form of death by coconut is by trauma resulting from a coconut falling from a tree under the force of gravity, variations on the phenomenon have also been reported.

In December 1923, in New Castle, Pennsylvania, a man was killed while trying to crack open a coconut with the butt end of a loaded revolver. The gun discharged and the man was shot in the abdomen.

One of the most unusual variations occurred in India in the 1930s. Newspapers across the world reported that a schoolboy in India had been killed by a "magic" or "enchanted" coconut. In an effort to determine who had taken a book from a classroom, an elementary school teacher at Harnahalli required each of his students to touch a coconut bearing a namam, a religious symbol. The teacher claimed that the one who took the book would face "divine wrath" upon touching the coconut. One student resisted, but was forced to touch the coconut. He reportedly contracted a high fever, fell into delirium and died within an hour.

In April 1983, a coconut was cited as the cause of death for a female goose-beaked whale. The husk from a coconut became lodged in its intestine and the whale beached itself on a sandbar at Siesta Key, Florida.

Other occurrences involve coconuts being used as deadly weapons. These include:

- In 1944, reports were published that Japanese troops were using "coconut bombs" in defending against the American invasion of Leyte. Col. Allan Feldman reported that the bombs were created by placing hand grenades and picric acid inside hollowed-out coconuts. The coconuts were then sealed with wax, attached to a string and thrown at the American troops.
- In July 2004, a 55-year-old Sri Lankan man was killed when he was struck on the head by a coconut. Police concluded that the blow was not the result of a coconut falling from a tree, but rather had been sustained in a fight that developed after the victim invited "a group of friends to his hut to enjoy a hooch party".

There have also been reports of deaths resulting from the collapse of coconut palm trees. These include:

- In April 1992, an 81-year-old man was killed in Malaysia when he was pinned under the trunk of a coconut tree that had been uprooted by high winds. His family noted that he had been employed as a "coconut plucker" and had previously survived a fall from a coconut tree.
- In May 2006, a man and a boy were killed by falling coconut palm trees during a tropical storm in the Philippines.
- In August 2011, a 56-year-old man was killed after an entire coconut tree toppled onto him while he was motorcycling in Kampung Baru Seberang Takir, Kuala Terengganu, Malaysia.
- In August 2020, a 37-year-old man died of severe head injuries after a coconut tree he was hired to help cut down fell on him. The incident occurred in a roadside gully near Banana Beach, along the coastal road from Surin to Nai Thon, Thailand.
- On November 2, 2025, a 53-year-old man died in Bohol, Philippines, after being struck by a falling coconut tree while clearing debris from Typhoon Kalmaegi (locally named as Tino). He was the first reported death from the typhoon.

Other reports credit the strength of the coconut palm trees with saving the lives of persons who have been tied to the trees for safety during high wind or tsunami events.

== Coconuts and the law ==
Deaths and injuries resulting from falling coconuts have been the subject of several legal proceedings that have been covered in the media.

In 1956, the City of Miami paid $300 to a woman after a coconut fell from a city-owned tree and struck her in the foot. In justifying the award, the city attorney explained that the city was allegedly on notice of the danger because "a reasonable man would assume it was about to fall when it turns brown".

In 1977, a jury in Hawaii awarded $39,000 to a police officer who was struck by a falling coconut. The officer was hit in the head while removing fronds from a public sidewalk in Lahaina, Hawaii. The property owner was sued for failing to maintain the trees.

== Popular culture ==
The American poet Frederick Seidel wrote a poem titled "Coconut", which included the following lines:

A coconut can fall and hit you on the head,
And if it falls from high enough can kind of knock you dead
Dead beneath the coconut palms, that's the life for me!

On their 1995 CD Makin' A Mess, the writing/singing team of Bob Gibson and Shel Silverstein included a song on this subject, titled "Killed by a Coconut", which humorously describes a series of men and their fatal encounters with coconuts.

Falling coconut injuries were featured in the American television series Gilligan's Island. A June 1965 episode revolved around an injury sustained by Gilligan after a falling coconut hit him in the nose. Actor Bob Denver explained the success of the series as follows: "Little kids seem to love it. It doesn't take a great intellect or reasoning power to be able to laugh at a monkey running off with Gilligan's dinner or a guy getting conked on the head by a coconut." When Denver died, the show's creator Sherwood Schwartz said that Denver did not get enough credit for his talent as a slapstick actor, saying, "A lot of people don't think it's hard to be an actor where all you have to do is react to a falling coconut". In the 2000 film Cast Away, the stranded character played by Tom Hanks is alarmed several times by loud thuds, which he cannot identify. He finally sees a coconut fall, making the sound.

In March 2006, Newsweek ran a satirical article on former Enron CEO Kenneth Lay, stating he testified that he had sustained amnesia after being struck in the head by a falling coconut and, as a result of the injury, was unable to recall the events that occurred during his time at Enron.

When Keith Richards of The Rolling Stones underwent surgery and hospitalization for a brain injury in April 2006, some press reports erroneously blamed the injury on Richards' having been "conked by coconuts". Falling coconuts had not caused the injury, as Richards had climbed a dead tree (not a coconut palm) and had then fallen from the tree.

Roald Dahl's short story "The Boy Who Talked With Animals" describes a tourist's death by falling coconut.

The video game Donkey Kong 3 has the antagonist Donkey Kong throwing coconuts from overhead at the player, trying to kill him. A hit causes a missed turn.

In the SpongeBob SquarePants episode "Rock-a-Bye Bivalve", Patrick Star is addicted to a show where nothing happens except a man gets hit in the head by a coconut.

In the Sonic the Hedgehog video game series, several robotic enemies stylized after monkeys throw coconuts at Sonic from the trees as he runs past.

== See also ==
- Lists of unusual deaths
- Thalaikoothal – a form of senicide involving an elderly person being forced to drink significant amounts of coconut water

== Bibliography ==
- David Del Monté (2013). Coconuts Kill More People Than Sharks. AuthorHouse. ISBN 978-1477215531. (fiction)
