= List of storms named Paula =

The name Paula has been used for three tropical cyclones worldwide.

In the Atlantic Ocean:

- Hurricane Paula (2010) – a small hurricane that struck Honduras and Cuba, causing minimal damage.

In the Australian region:

- Cyclone Paula (1973) – formed southwest of Indonesia, not making landfall.

In the South Pacific Ocean:

- Cyclone Paula (2001) – caused extensive damage to areas of Vanuatu.

== See also ==
- Cyclone Pola (2019) – a South Pacific severe tropical cyclone with a similar name.
