= Hurricane Paula =

Category 2 Atlantic hurricane in 2010

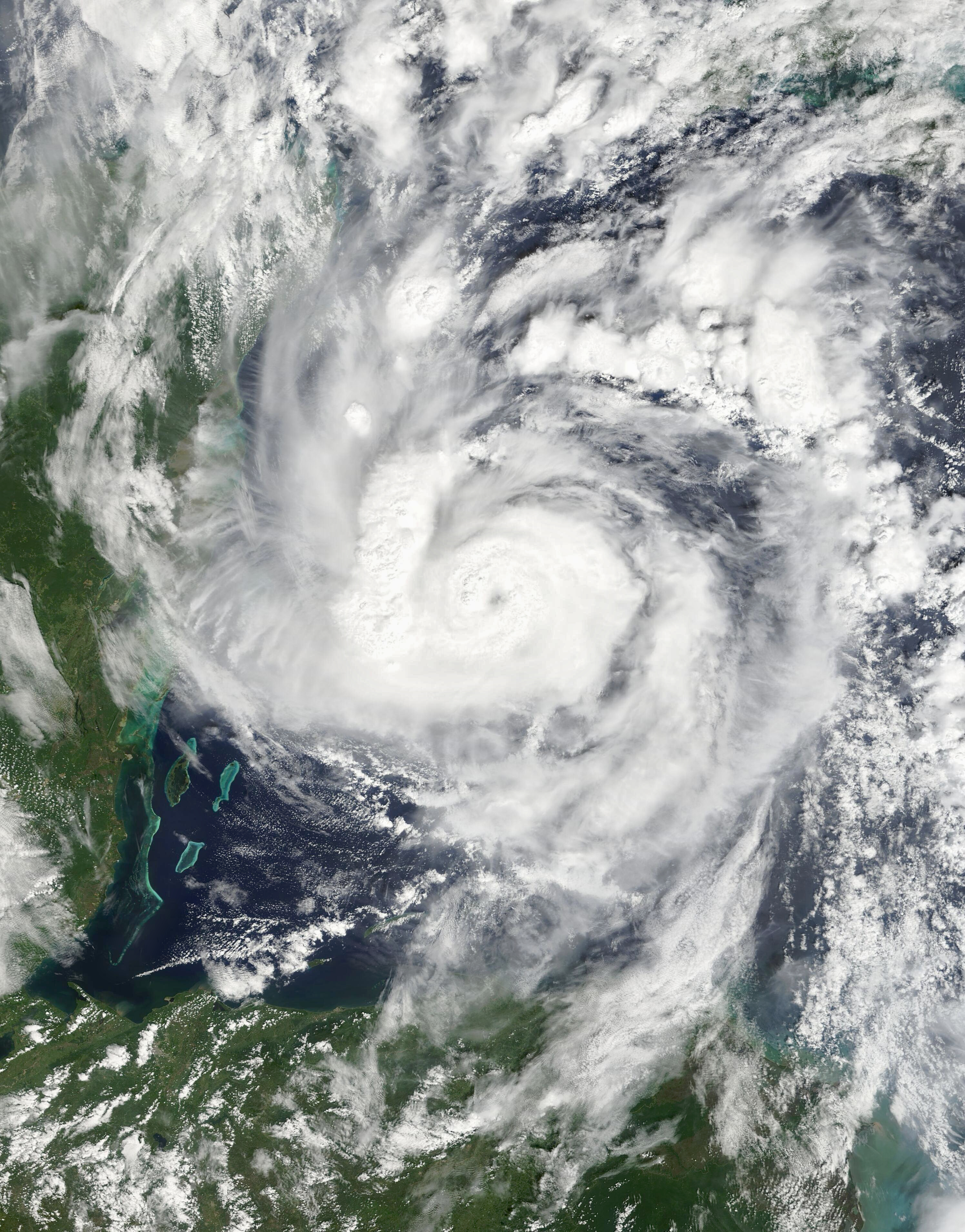
- Hurricane Paula near peak intensity off the Yucatán Peninsula on October 12

Meteorological history
- Formed: October 10, 2010
- Dissipated: October 16, 2010

Category 2 hurricane
- 1-minute sustained (SSHWS/NWS)
- Highest winds: 105 mph (165 km/h)
- Lowest pressure: 981 mbar (hPa); 28.97 inHg

Overall effects
- Fatalities: 1 direct
- Damage: Unknown
- Areas affected: Nicaragua, Honduras, Mexico, Cuba, Bahamas and Florida
- IBTrACS
- Part of the 2010 Atlantic hurricane season

Hurricane Paula was a small hurricane that struck Honduras and Cuba in October 2010. The eighteenth tropical cyclone, sixteenth named storm, and ninth hurricane of the season, Paula developed from a low pressure area over the southwestern Caribbean Sea on October 11. Moving northwestward, it slowly organized and was upgraded to a tropical storm shortly thereafter. Around midday on October 11, Paula made landfall near Cabo Gracias a Dios at the border of Honduras and Nicaragua. In northeastern Honduras, strong winds destroyed several homes, while rainfall destroyed a few roads and dozens of buildings, include a school and a police station. Favorable conditions such as low wind shear and warm sea surface temperatures allowed Paula to reach hurricane status early on October 12. Further intensification occurred, and the storm peaked with winds of 105 mph (165 km/h) while curving northward on October 13.

Due to Paula's small size, impact in Mexico was minor, mainly limited to light rainfall and winds. However, an American tourist drowned offshore Cozumel. After Paula attained its peak intensity on October 13, wind shear began to increase, causing the storm to weaken. The storm turned north-northeastward and fell to tropical storm intensity on October 14. Shortly thereafter, Paula made landfall in the Cuban province of Pinar del Río. Early on October 15, Paula weakened to a tropical depression while moving eastward over Cuba, before degenerating into a remnant low pressure area about six hours later. In Cuba, rainfall was mostly beneficial. Strong winds, with gusts reaching 68 mph (109 km/h), left power outages in Pinar del Río and Artemisa provinces. In the Havana area, a few homes were deroofed, while falling trees blocked many roads. Impact in the Florida Keys was minimal, limited to light rainfall and increased tides.

== Meteorological history ==
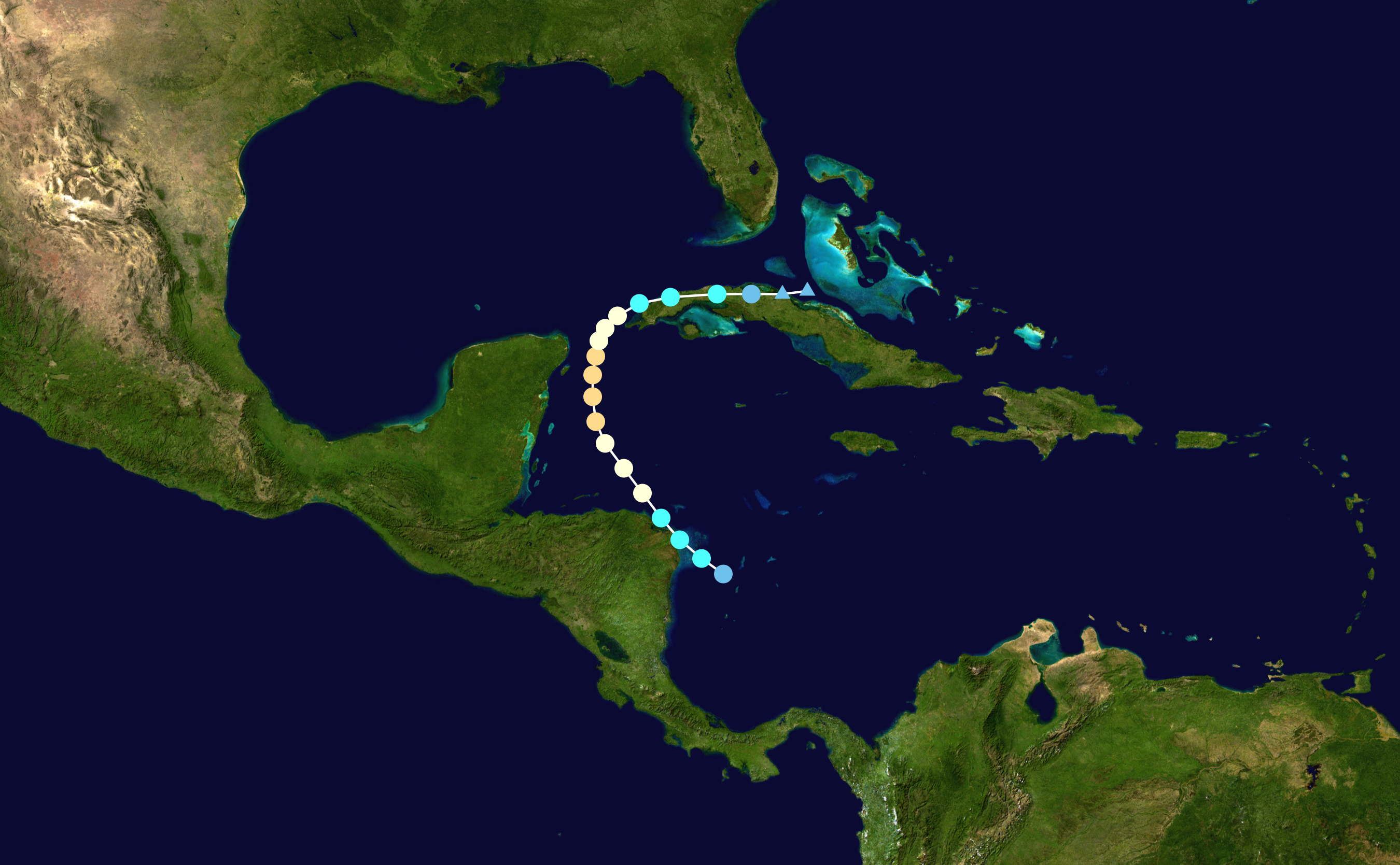
Map plotting the storm's track and intensity, according to the Saffir–Simpson scale Map key Saffir–Simpson scale Tropical depression (≤38 mph, ≤62 km/h) Tropical storm (39–73 mph, 63–118 km/h) Category 1 (74–95 mph, 119–153 km/h) Category 2 (96–110 mph, 154–177 km/h) Category 3 (111–129 mph, 178–208 km/h) Category 4 (130–156 mph, 209–251 km/h) Category 5 (≥157 mph, ≥252 km/h) Unknown Storm type Tropical cyclone Subtropical cyclone Extratropical cyclone, remnant low, tropical disturbance, or monsoon depression

Tropical Storm Nicole exited the Caribbean Sea and became extratropical on September 29, before dissipating on the next day, leaving behind a broad area of cyclonic circulation at the lower levels of the atmosphere. A southeasterly-moving cold front drifted from the Gulf of Mexico into the Caribbean Sea on October 5, and developed into a stationary north–south trough axis the following day. When a tropical wave that was associated with the previous development of Hurricane Otto traced into the Caribbean on October 7, there was an escalation in the convection associated with the system. Another tropical wave traveled from the Lesser Antilles to the western Caribbean between October 9 and 10. A large low-pressure area formed as the wave interacted with the trough; however, convection decreased on October 10.

After convection increased again, the eighteenth tropical depression of the season developed at 0000 UTC on October 11, while situated about 120 miles (190 km) southeast of Cabo Gracias a Dios, which is on the Honduras-Nicaragua border. About six hours later, the depression strengthened into Tropical Storm Paula. Steered northwestward around the southwestern periphery of a subtropical ridge, the storm made landfall near Cabo Gracias a Dios with winds of 50 mph (85 km/h) at 1200 UTC. Shortly thereafter, the storm began to significantly intensify, due to sea surface temperatures of 84.2 °F (29.0 °C), as well as light to moderate wind shear. Operationally, the National Hurricane Center did not initiate advisories until late on October 11, after satellite imagery, surface observations, and reconnaissance aircraft flight data confirmed the existence of a tropical cyclone; by this time, Paula was already a strong tropical storm.

At 0000 UTC on October 12, Paula strengthened into a Category 1 hurricane on the Saffir–Simpson hurricane wind scale. Satellite imagery during the afternoon of October 12 indicated that Paula was a small hurricane, consisting of a round area of deep convection, with an eye feature developing. However, at 1800 UTC on October 12, the storm strengthened into a Category 2 hurricane while curving northward. Simultaneously, Paula attained its peak intensity with maximum sustained winds of 105 mph (165 km/h) and a minimum barometric pressure of 981 mbar (29.0 inHg). After reaching peak intensity late on October 12, strong upper-level west-southwesterly winds interacted with the system, prompting weakening. Paula was a very small hurricane; hurricane-force winds extended only 25 miles (40 km) from the center of Paula, while tropical storm-force winds extended 70 miles (110 km) from the same point. Paula moved north-northwest as the storm was impacted by a mid-latitude trough over the Gulf of Mexico.

Increasing wind shear caused Paula to weaken to a Category 1 hurricane late on October 13. Satellite imagery and reconnaissance aircraft flights indicated that cloud pattern was disrupted and the mid- and low-level centers were becoming detached. Shortly thereafter, Lixion Avila of the National Hurricane Center remarked about the size of Paula, stating that, "a hurricane is crossing between the western tip of Cuba and eastern Yucatan...but without modern technology no one would know it was there". Drifting north-northeastward ahead of a mid-latitude trough, Paula weakened to a tropical storm at 1200 UTC on October 14. Three hours later, the storm made landfall between Santa Lucía and Puerto Esperanza, in the Pinar del Río Province of Cuba, with winds of 65 mph (100 km/h). By 0600 UTC on October 15, Paula weakened to a tropical depression, while moving eastward over Cuba. Six hours later, the storm degenerated into a remnant low before completely dissipating early on October 16.

== Preparations and impact ==
=== Honduras and Nicaragua ===
A weakening Hurricane Paula approaching Cuba on October 13

When the National Hurricane Center initiated advisories on Paula at 2100 UTC on October 11, a tropical storm warning was issued from Limón eastward to the Honduras-Nicaragua. The tropical storm warning was discontinued at 1200 UTC on the following day. The Comisión Permanente de Contingencias (COPECO) issued a red alert for Bay Islands late on October 11. Additionally, a yellow alert was issued for five departments, including Atlántida, Colón, Cortés, Olancho, and Yoro. A state of emergency was also declared for the Bay Islands Department on October 12 and was to remain in place for 48 hours.

Along the northeastern coast of Honduras, several homes were destroyed by the storm. Dangerous conditions produced by Paula also forced officials to evacuate low-lying areas and shut down schools. Gale-force winds onshore resulted in the closure of the Puerto Lempira Airport. Throughout coastal districts, rainfall from the storm ranged from 5.9 to 7.9 in (150 to 200 mm), resulting in widespread flooding. Winds from the storm were also estimated up to 60 mph (97 km/h), and locals in La Mosquitia stated that the winds were stronger than those produced by Hurricane Mitch in 1998. In Puerto Lempira, four homes and two roads were destroyed by high winds and flooding. In the city, a total of 3.31 in (84 mm) of rain fell during Paula's passage on October 11. More than a dozen structures in Cauquira, including a school and police station were also damaged by flood waters. Along the coast, waves up to 7 ft (2.1 m) pounded beaches.

In Nicaragua, the storm produced heavy rainfall in some areas, though otherwise, impact is unknown.

=== Mexico and Belize ===
In Mexico, a tropical storm warning was issued from Chetumal to Punta Gruesa at 2100 UTC on October 11. Simultaneously, a hurricane warning was posted from Punta Gruesa to Cancún, including Cozumel. Early on October 12, another tropical storm warning was issued from Cabo Catoche to San Felipe. Around that time, the hurricane warning was modified to include Punta Gruesa to Cabo Catoche. Later on October 12, the tropical storm warning Chetumal to Punta Gruesa was discontinued, as was the hurricane warning from Punta Gruesa to Punta Allen early on the following day. At 1500 UTC on October 13, the tropical storm warning was revised to include Cancún to San Felipe. Simultaneously, the hurricane warning from Punta Allen to Cabo Catoche was canceled. Late on October 13, the tropical storm warning from Cancún to San Felipe. Officials assured tourists their safety and did not issue evacuations; however, about 1,560 locals were evacuated from Isla Holbox and Isla Contoy. Roughly 28,800 people were estimated to be visiting the region, most of whom were in Cancún. Between October 12 and 13, transportation officials canceled 22 international flights to and from Cancún.

Off the coast of Cozumel, an American citizen drowned after being overcome by rough seas produced by the storm. Only light to moderate rain fell along the northeastern coast of the Yucatán Peninsula; throughout October 13, 0.91 in (23 mm) of rain had fallen in Cancún and winds gusted up to 27 mph (43 km/h). Despite the storm's close passage to the Yucatán Peninsula, Paula's small size resulted in very little impact on land. According to Quintana Roo Governor Félix González Canto, the storm left no structural or vegetative damage. Following the hurricane's passage, the red alerts issued for four Mexican states were discontinued and ports were re-opened.

In Belize, a tropical storm watch was issued for the entire country at 0000 UTC on October 12. It was discontinued about nine hours later. The Government of Belize suspended school classes, as the buildings were being used as storm shelters. Voluntary evacuations were recommended for residents of the coastal cayes. A small craft warning was declared along the coast and advised marines to take precautions. At Punta Negra, the National Guard of Belize evacuated residents on October 13. However, no impact was reported in Belize.

=== Cuba and Florida ===
In Cuba, a hurricane warning was issued for Pinar del Río Province – the westernmost province – at 2100 UTC on October 12. After Paula weakened to a tropical storm on October 14, the hurricane warning was downgraded to a tropical storm warning. Early on October 15, the tropical storm warning was discontinued. Officials recommended that those residing in low-lying to evacuate for higher ground. The tobacco plants in Pinar del Rio, which are used to make Cuban cigars, were protected.

In Cuba, the outer bands of Paula brought heavy localized rains, especially to the Isla de la Juventud where 2.8 in (71 mm) of precipitation was recorded on October 12. Heavy rain fell across much of Pinar del Río Province. In Cape San Antonio, 4.85 in (123 mm) of rain fell by the morning of October 14. In some areas of western Cuba, the heavy precipitation was beneficial to reservoirs, grain crops, tubers and vegetables. The highest winds recorded during the storm's passage were measured in Puerto Esperanza at 68 mph (109 km/h). Strong winds left power outages in Viñales, La Palma, Bahía Honda, and San Cristóbal. Near Havana, a few homes lost their roofs and power was lost to many homes, mostly as a result of a precautionary power shutdown. High winds also downed numerous trees, blocking many roads. Along the coast, rough seas damaged parts of the capital city's seawall. Some streets near the shore were left under 1 to 2 ft (0.30 to 0.61 m) of water at the height of the storm. By the afternoon of October 15, emergency crews began clearing debris left behind by the storm. A small portion of banana crops in the Havana area suffered losses. Throughout the country, Paula resulted in relatively little damage.

In Florida, a tropical storm watch was issued from Dry Tortugas to Craig Key at 1500 UTC on October 13. The tropical storm watch was discontinued early on October 15. In the Florida Keys, the outer bands of Paula brought moderate rainfall and increased surf. A total of 1.51 in (38 mm) of rain in Key West had fallen between October 13 and 15. Two waterspouts were reported offshore the Upper Florida Keys on October 14. Following the threat of a landfalling storm in Florida, orange juice futures dropped by 8.9%, reaching their lowest value since September 9. Values for delivery fell to $1.409 a pound (453 grams) at the worst of the downturn.

== See also ==
- Other storms of the same name
- List of Category 2 Atlantic hurricanes
- List of Cuba hurricanes
- Hurricane Stan (2005)
- Hurricane Richard (2010)
- Hurricane Rina (2011)
