= Haunsabhavi =

Haunsbhavi
- village
- Country: India
- State: Karnataka
- District: Haveri
- Talukas: Hirekerur

Population (2001)
  - Total: 5,771

Languages
  - Official: Kannada
- Time zone: UTC+5:30 (IST)
- PIN: 581109
- Nearest city: Hubli, Davangere
- Lok Sabha constituency: Haveri
- Vidhan Sabha constituency: Hirekerur

Haunsbhavi is a village in the southern state of Karnataka, India. It is located in the Hirekerur taluk of Haveri district in Karnataka. It is an educational hub and a land famous for freedom fighters. Few notable people from this village took participation in the freedom struggle and have made this village famous. One of the most famous person who made Haunsbhavi as his home was Shivappa Nesvi.

== Educational institutes ==
- Durgad High School
- NMD Girls School
- MASC PU College
- MASC College
- Rural Polytechnic
- Swami Vivekananda school
- Sri someshwara English medium school

== Notable names ==
Shivappa Nesvi: Was a freedom fighter and a follower of Subash Chandra Bose, he was also known as Kranthiveer Shivanna locally. He left his education in medicine during the forties and joined the quit India movement and fought for the freedom of the country. Being a follower of Bose he joined a group of freedom fighters and fought against the British. The then Majesty's empire had a reward placed on his head for 500 Rs which was a big sum at that time. After the independence he finished his doctorate and dedicated his life treating the poor.

== Demographics ==
As of 2001 India census, Haunsabhavi had a population of 5771 with 2931 males and 2840 females.

== See also ==
- Haveri
- Districts of Karnataka
