= Cyclone Paula =

Severe Tropical Cyclone Paula
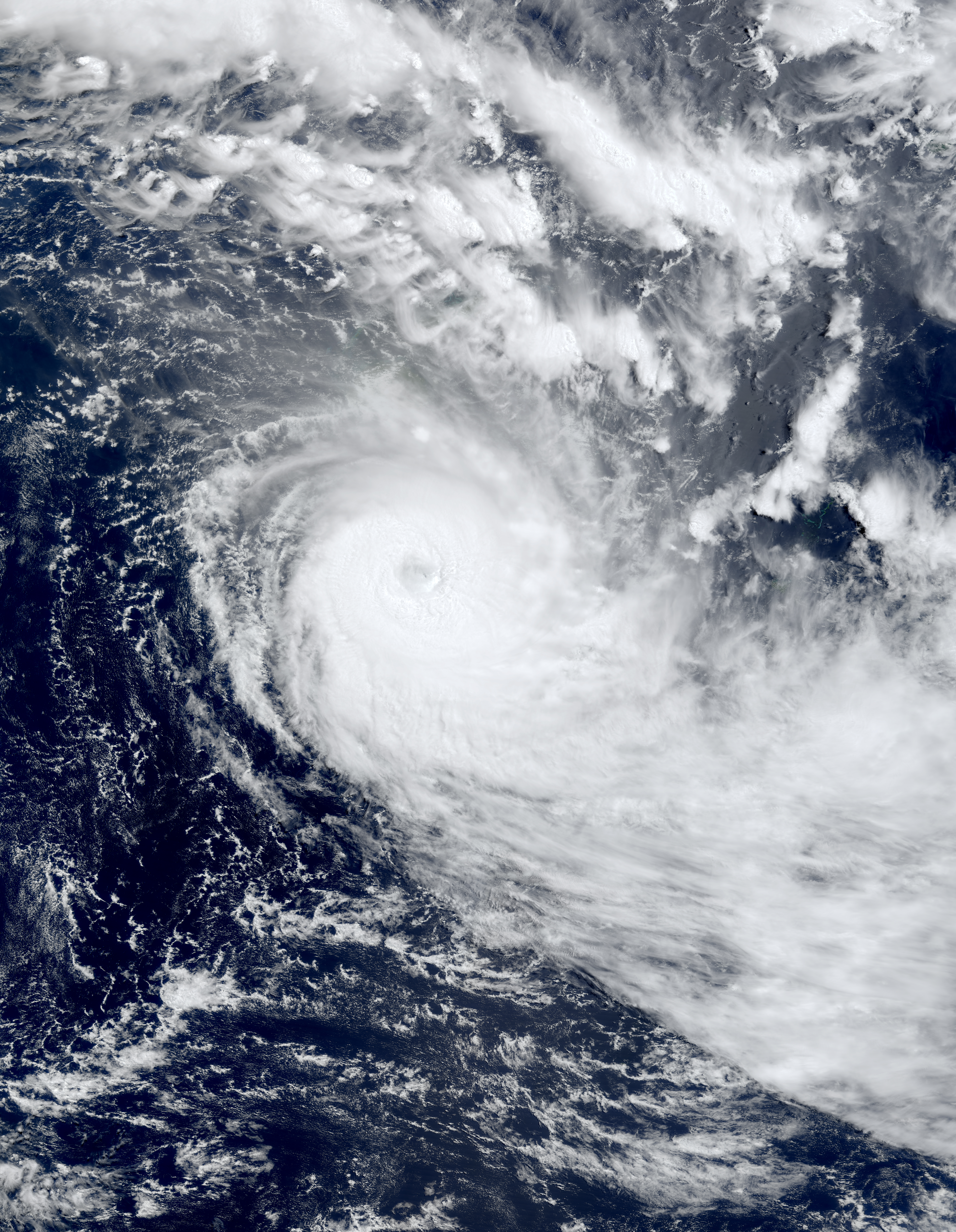
- Cyclone Paula near peak intensity on March 1

Meteorological history
- Formed: February 25, 2001
- Dissipated: March 4, 2001

Category 4 severe tropical cyclone
- 10-minute sustained (FMS)
- Highest winds: 175 km/h (110 mph)
- Lowest pressure: 930 hPa (mbar); 27.46 inHg

Category 3-equivalent tropical cyclone
- 1-minute sustained (SSHWS/JTWC)
- Highest winds: 195 km/h (120 mph)
- Lowest pressure: 938 hPa (mbar); 27.70 inHg

Overall effects
- Fatalities: 2
- Damage: $1.39 million (2001 USD)
- Areas affected: Vanuatu, Fiji
- IBTrACS
- Part of the 2000–01 South Pacific cyclone season

Severe Tropical Cyclone Paula was a tropical cyclone which caused extensive damage to areas of Vanuatu. The cyclone was the second cyclone and only severe tropical cyclone of the relatively inactive 2000–01 South Pacific cyclone season. Cyclone Paula developed from an area of disturbed weather embedded within a monsoon trough on February 25, 2001, near Vanuatu. Situated in an area of favorable conditions, Paula steadily intensified as it moved in a general direction towards the southeast. On March 1, Paula reached peak intensity with winds of 175 km/h (109 mph), sustained for ten minutes. However, the cyclone began to accelerate further to the southeast into more unfavorable conditions. As a result, Paula quickly weakened, and thus degenerated into an extratropical cyclone on March 4.

== Meteorological history ==
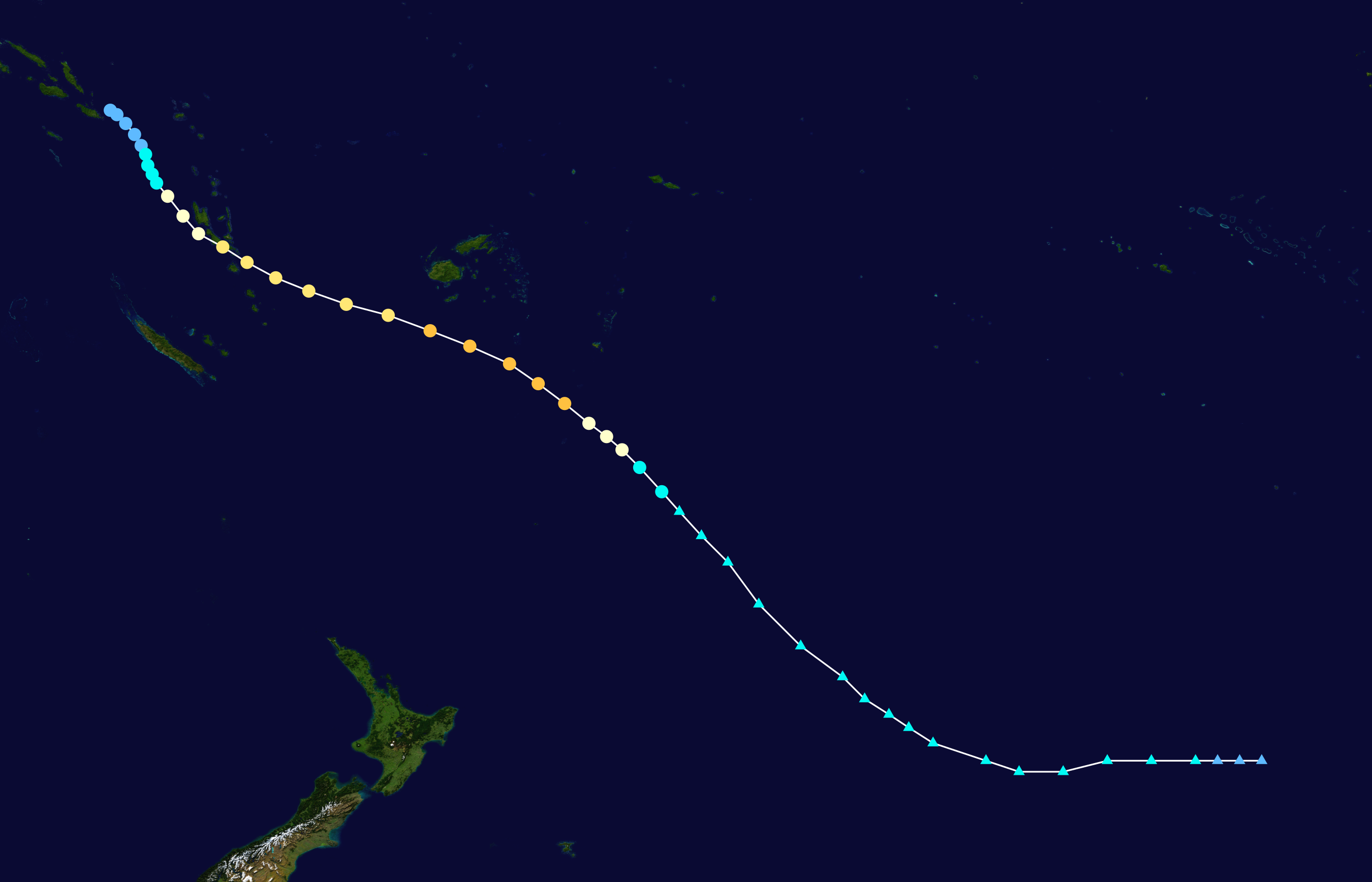
Map plotting the storm's track and intensity, according to the Saffir–Simpson scale Map key Saffir–Simpson scale Tropical depression (≤38 mph, ≤62 km/h) Tropical storm (39–73 mph, 63–118 km/h) Category 1 (74–95 mph, 119–153 km/h) Category 2 (96–110 mph, 154–177 km/h) Category 3 (111–129 mph, 178–208 km/h) Category 4 (130–156 mph, 209–251 km/h) Category 5 (≥157 mph, ≥252 km/h) Unknown Storm type Tropical cyclone Subtropical cyclone Extratropical cyclone, remnant low, tropical disturbance, or monsoon depression

The low pressure area that would eventually develop into Cyclone Paula was first identified at 1800 UTC on February 25, embedded within a monsoon trough 340 km (210 mi) south of Espiritu Santo, Vanuatu. At the time, the system was positioned under an upper-level outflow center and located in an area of warm sea surface temperatures (SSTs) of about 30 °C (86 °F). Early the next day, a sharp increase in oceanic heat content triggered a rapid burst of convection in the northern and eastern quadrants of the system. Associated rainbands also began to increasingly curve toward the circulation center of the low pressure area. An expanding circulation center and persistently deep convection allowed barometric pressures within the system to steadily fall. QuikSCAT and SSM/I data indicated that winds of gale force were persisting in northeastern areas of the system. As a result, the storm system was upgraded to cyclone status and was given the name Paula at 1200 UTC on February 26 by the Regional Specialized Meteorological Center in Nadi, Fiji (RSMC Nadi). The Joint Typhoon Warning Center (JTWC) also began to track the system, issuing its first cyclone warning on the same day at 1500 UTC, noting at the cyclone's persistent deep convection. At the time of its naming, Cyclone Paula was moving towards the southeast at 20 km/h (10 mph).

In an area of weak steering currents, Paula began to move in a small, clockwise loop. Quickly intensifying under favorable conditions and an environment of low wind shear, the cyclone reached Category 2 status on the Australian cyclone scale at 0000 UTC on February 27, with winds of 90 km/h (55 mph), sustained for ten minutes. After completing its small cyclonic loop, the cyclone developed a small central dense overcast (CDO), containing a ragged eye. Throughout the day the eye became increasingly better defined as the cyclone accelerated towards the southeast. Still strengthening, Cyclone Paula moved across the Vanuatu island chain, making landfall just north of Port Vila, Vanuatu at 1200 UTC on February 28 with winds of 155 km/h (95 mph), sustained for ten minutes. After passing Vanuatu, Paula moved towards Fiji, quickly passing the island to the south. The cyclone made its closest pass to Fiji at 1800 UTC on March 1, 145 km (90 mi) south-southwest of Kadavu Island. Operationally, it was believed that Paula peaked at intensity at this time according to RSMC Nadi with ten-minute sustained winds of 165 km/h (105 mph), but this was revised to 175 km/h (110 mph) and a minimum barometric pressure of 935 mbar (27.6 inHg) in post-season analysis.

After passing to the south of Fiji, Cyclone Paula quickly accelerated into an area of strong vertical wind shear, due to a strong northwesterly wind current. As a result, the cyclone promptly began to quickly weaken, with maximum ten-minute sustained winds dropping by 55 km/h (34 mph) in 30 hours. After passing 350 km (220 mi) south of Tonga, Cyclone Paula moved into the Tropical Cyclone Warning Center in Wellington, New Zealand's (TCWC Wellington) area of responsibility. Still weakening, Paula transitioned into an extratropical cyclone at 0600 UTC on March 4, 1,700 km (1,100 mi) east-northeast of the northern tip of New Zealand. The JTWC subsequently issued their final warning on the system at 1200 UTC, later that day.

== Preparations and impact ==
=== Vanuatu ===
As Cyclone Paula threatened Vanuatu, RSMC Nadi issued a total of 14 special advisories for the island chain at six–hour intervals, beginning at 2344 UTC on February 25, and ending at 0230 UTC on March 1. In the Port Vila area, an estimated 100 families were evacuated from potentially flood-prone areas.

The cyclone caused heavy rainfall and flooding across Vanuatu. Areas in the western parts of Espiritu Santo experienced damage due to strong winds and flooding in low-lying areas due to Cyclone Paula, forcing the evacuation of communities to higher ground. Trees were also uprooted, causing damage to communication lines and resulting in power outages. An estimated 45–50% of all houses and gardens in Vanuatu were reported to have been damaged by the cyclone, as well as 25% of other infrastructure. A 19-year-old boy drowned in floodwaters caused by Paula after trying to get his canoe to safety.

=== Fiji ===
In Fiji's Western Division, strong storm surge destroyed homes in nine villages across the coastline. Root crops, fruit trees, and sugar cane fields were damaged due to Paula. Strong rains also resulted in minor landslides and road closures. One fatality resulted from Cyclone Paula in Fiji.

== See also ==
- List of Category 4 South Pacific severe tropical cyclones
