= Hurricane Earl (2022) =

Category 2 Atlantic hurricane

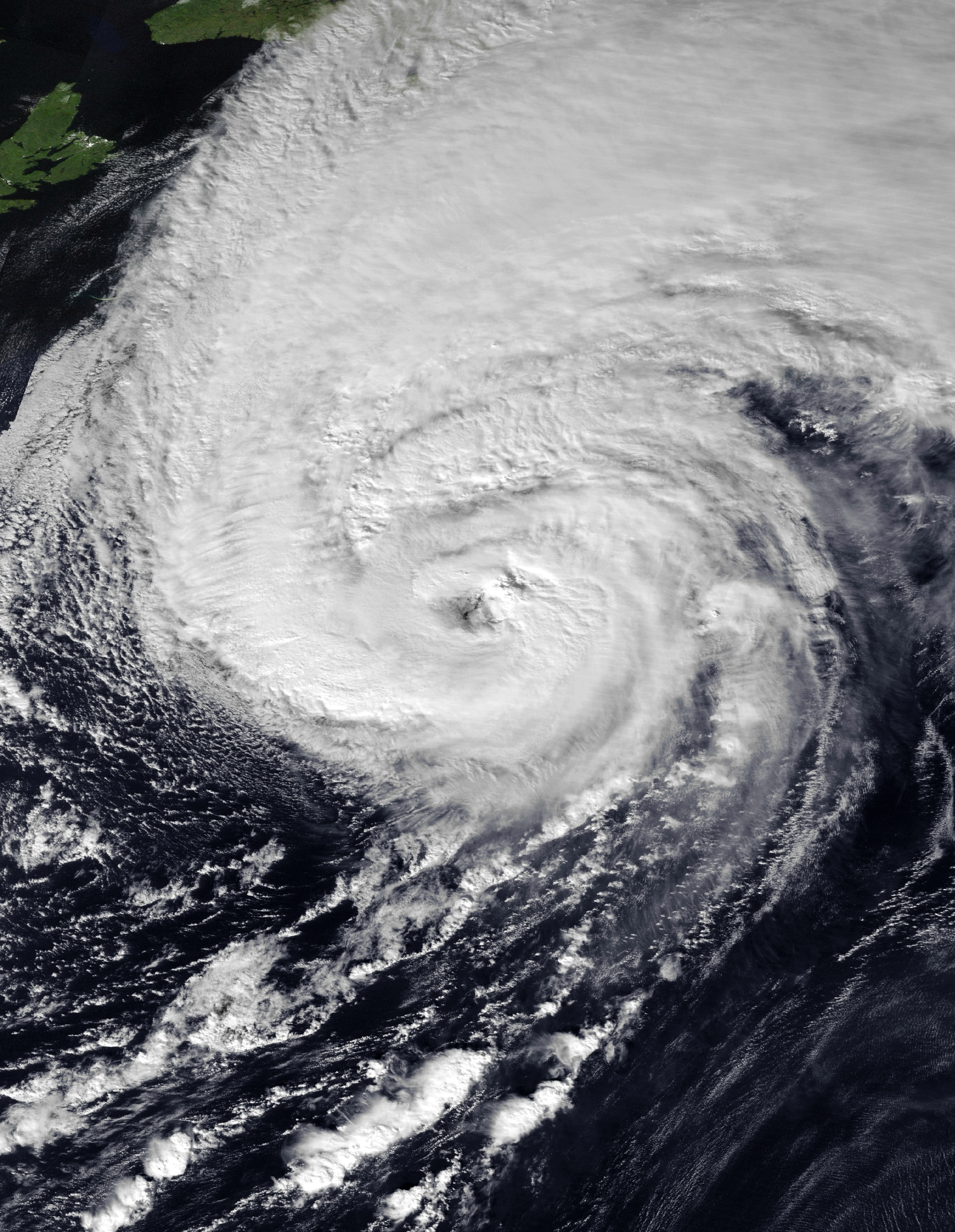
- Earl at peak intensity while passing by Atlantic Canada on September 10

Meteorological history
- Formed: September 2, 2022
- Extratropical: September 10, 2022
- Dissipated: September 15, 2022

Category 2 hurricane
- 1-minute sustained (SSHWS/NWS)
- Highest winds: 110 mph (175 km/h)
- Lowest pressure: 948 mbar (hPa); 27.99 inHg

Overall effects
- Fatalities: 2 total
- Damage: Minimal
- Areas affected: Puerto Rico, Bermuda, Newfoundland
- Part of the 2022 Atlantic hurricane season

Hurricane Earl was a large, long-lived Category 2 hurricane that brought heavy rain to Puerto Rico and Newfoundland in September 2022 despite remaining mostly out to sea. The fifth named storm and second hurricane of the 2022 Atlantic hurricane season, Earl originated from a tropical wave that moved off the coast of Africa on August 25. The wave struggled to develop over the next week as it moved west-northwestward in a marginally conducive environment. Eventually, the system was able to organize into Tropical Storm Earl on September 3. The storm passed through parts of the Caribbean, but strong wind shear initially halted Earl from intensifying and it maintained tropical storm status. The storm then turned northward into a more favorable environment and started to intensify. Earl eventually reached Category 2 hurricane status, before repeated dry air entrainments caused the storm to fluctuate in intensity. Earl reached peak winds of 110 mph (175 km/h) before quickly becoming extratropical off the coast of Newfoundland on September 10. It continued moving northeast before dissipating on September 15.

Four fatalities were related to Hurricane Earl: two from lightning in Puerto Rico and two from rip currents in New Jersey. The storm struck Newfoundland with hurricane-force winds and significant rainfall, but overall damage from the storm was minor.

== Meteorological history ==
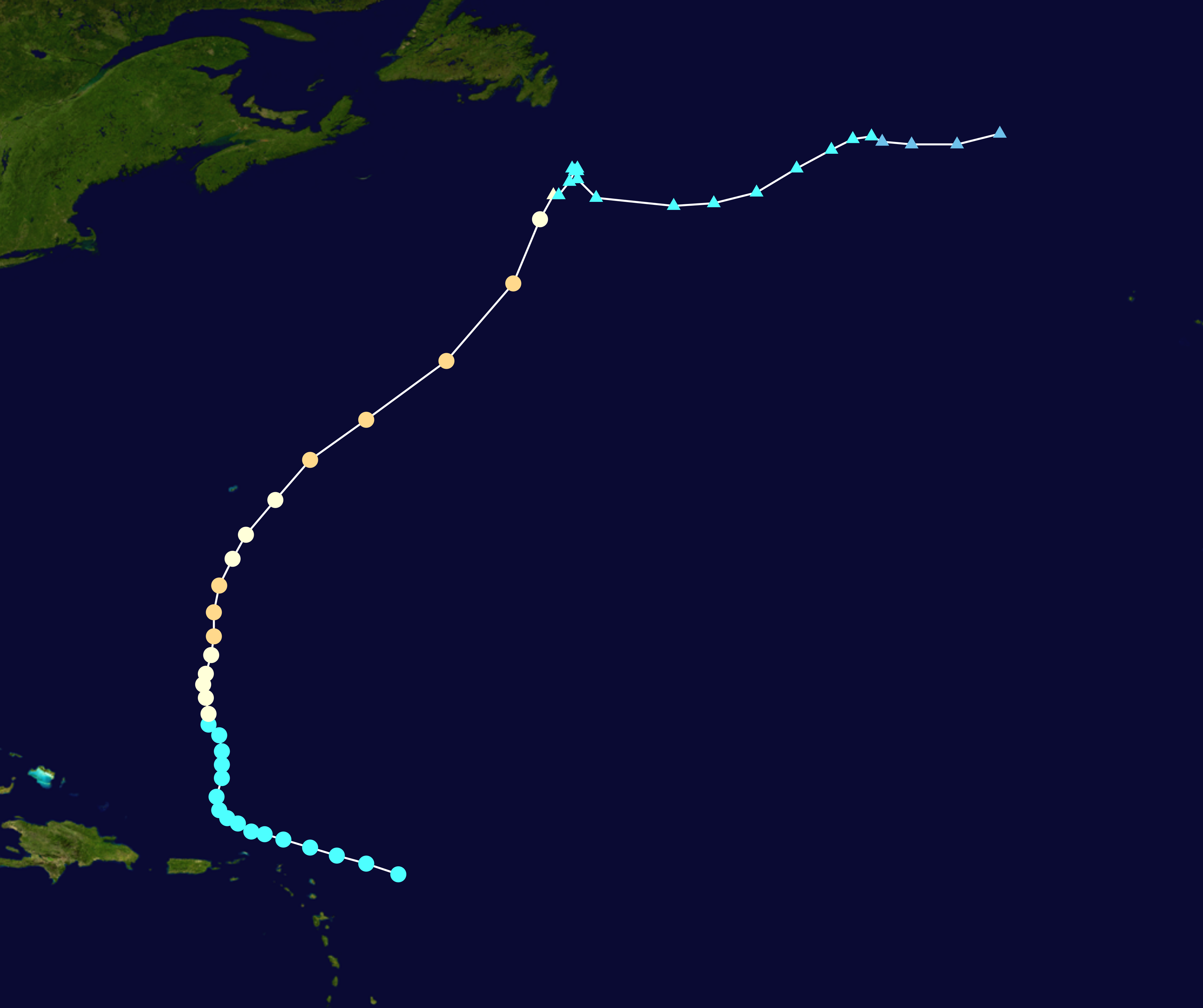
Map plotting the storm's track and intensity, according to the Saffir–Simpson scale Map key Saffir–Simpson scale Tropical depression (≤38 mph, ≤62 km/h) Tropical storm (39–73 mph, 63–118 km/h) Category 1 (74–95 mph, 119–153 km/h) Category 2 (96–110 mph, 154–177 km/h) Category 3 (111–129 mph, 178–208 km/h) Category 4 (130–156 mph, 209–251 km/h) Category 5 (≥157 mph, ≥252 km/h) Unknown Storm type Tropical cyclone Subtropical cyclone Extratropical cyclone, remnant low, tropical disturbance, or monsoon depression

Earl originated from a tropical wave that was producing widespread disorganized showers and thunderstorms when it formed off the coast of Africa on August 25. After moving west across the eastern and central tropical Atlantic, the disturbance was met with environmental conditions east of the Leeward Islands that were only marginally conducive for a tropical cyclone's development. After struggling against high wind shear for many days, the disturbance was finally able to organize itself and developed into Tropical Storm Earl early on September 3. A burst of deep convection occurred near the center of Earl during the evening of September 5, and a Hurricane Hunter's mission into the storm later that night reported that it briefly strengthened to near hurricane strength. Earl's intensity continued to fluctuate throughout much of the next day due to ongoing effects of westerly deep-layer shear. Later that day, the shear quickly diminished, resulting in Earl becoming better organized and strengthening into a hurricane at around 00:00 UTC on September 7. By 03:00 UTC on September 8, Earl had reached Category 2 strength, still moving northward; Hurricane Hunters data showed it to have developed an eye of almost 60 mi (97 km) and a fairly symmetric wind field. Three hours later, the hurricane had attained peak sustained winds of 105 mph (165 km/h). Despite being forecasted to continue strengthening and peak as a Category 4 hurricane, Earl's inner core was repeatedly interrupted due to dry air entrainment and it fluctuated in strength the following day while passing well to the east of Bermuda despite being over extremely warm sea surface temperatures of around 84–86 °F (29–30 °C). It briefly weakened down to Category 1 hurricane strength early on September 9, before re-strengthening to Category 2 strength with a peak intensity of 110 mph (175 km/h) sustained winds and a minimum barometric pressure of 954 mbar (28.17 inHg). By this time, Earl had become a rather large hurricane, with hurricane-force winds extending outward up to 80 miles (130 km) from the center and tropical-storm-force winds extending outward up to 275 miles (443 km). After maintaining this intensity for several hours, Earl weakened down to a Category 1 hurricane again at 15:00 UTC on September 10, before transitioning into an extratropical cyclone due south of Cape Race, Newfoundland six hours later. Earl continued to move northeast after becoming extratropical and moved north of the Azores, approaching Europe. Earl's extratropical transitions was partly from and interaction with a trough. The post-tropical cyclone merged with the trough from September 11-12 and moved east-northeast. Earl continued to spiral north before dissipating on September 15 after "losing its identity" north of the Azores.

== Preparations and impacts ==
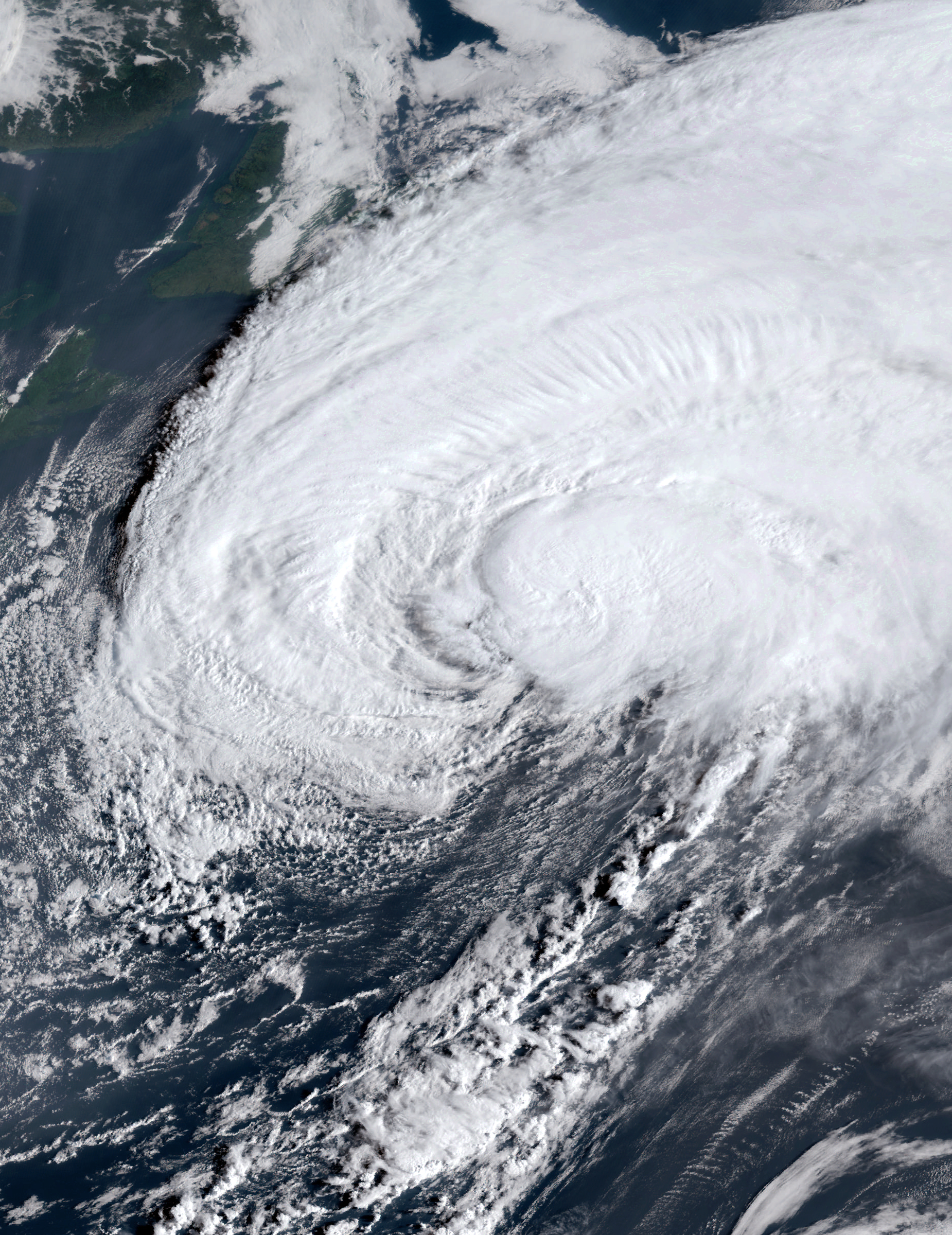
Hurricane Earl in the process of becoming a post-tropical cyclone on September 10

In Salinas, Puerto Rico, 2 people died after being struck by lightning while riding a jet ski. As Earl passed east of Florida, strong swells hit the eastern coast of the state. A large swell caused by Earl hit Cape Hatteras, North Carolina. Rip currents hit Surf City, North Carolina. Along the East Coast of the United States, large swells hit many states. Rip currents also hit many areas of New England. Two people drowned off the coast of New Jersey due to rip currents: one in Ocean City and the other in Loveladies. However, the NHC later determined these deaths were caused by swells from a cold front unrelated to Earl.

Bermuda was hit with sustained winds of 35 mph (60 km/h) as Earl passed within about 90 mi (145 km) away from the island's eastern coast; much higher gusts were reported, including one of 67 mph (108 km/h) at the National Museum of Bermuda. There were localized power outages across the archipelago but no major damage was reported. L.F. Wade International Airport reported gusts of 50–60 mph (80–97 km/h). Other parts of the island saw 1–3 in (25–76 mm) of rainfall. All travel to the territory was cancelled as Earl passed, including bus travel on the island.

Nova Scotia saw "life-threatening" swells. During a 36-hour period on September 10–12, 7–8 in (175–200 mm) of rain fell in the St. Johns area, causing overflowing along the Waterford River which led to a large amount of urban flooding. Similar rainfall amounts were also observed in communities throughout the Avalon Peninsula. Hurricane-force winds hit Grand Bank. Additionally, the cyclone caused rough surf which damaged the breakwater on the coast near Trepassey, Newfoundland and Labrador, bringing localized flooding to the area. A wall holding out water was destroyed in Trepassey after large waves from Earl hit it. As far out as St. Anthony, Newfoundland and Labrador saw heavy rains associated with Earl. Despite being far away from the United Kingdom and Ireland, the countries still saw heavy rainfall and rough surf from its outer bands.

== See also ==
- Weather of 2022
- Tropical cyclones in 2022
- Timeline of the 2022 Atlantic hurricane season
- Other storms of the same name
  - Hurricane Earl (2010) – Category 4 hurricane that took a similar path about 12 years earlier.
- Hurricane Larry (2021) – Category 3 hurricane that took a similar track the previous year.
- Hurricane Sam (2021) – Category 4 hurricane that took a similar track the previous year.
- Hurricane Fiona (2022) – Category 4 hurricane that took a similar track a few weeks later.
- Hurricane Ernesto (2024) – Category 2 hurricane that took a similar track two years later.
