= Hurricane Earl (2016) =

Category 1 Atlantic hurricane in 2016

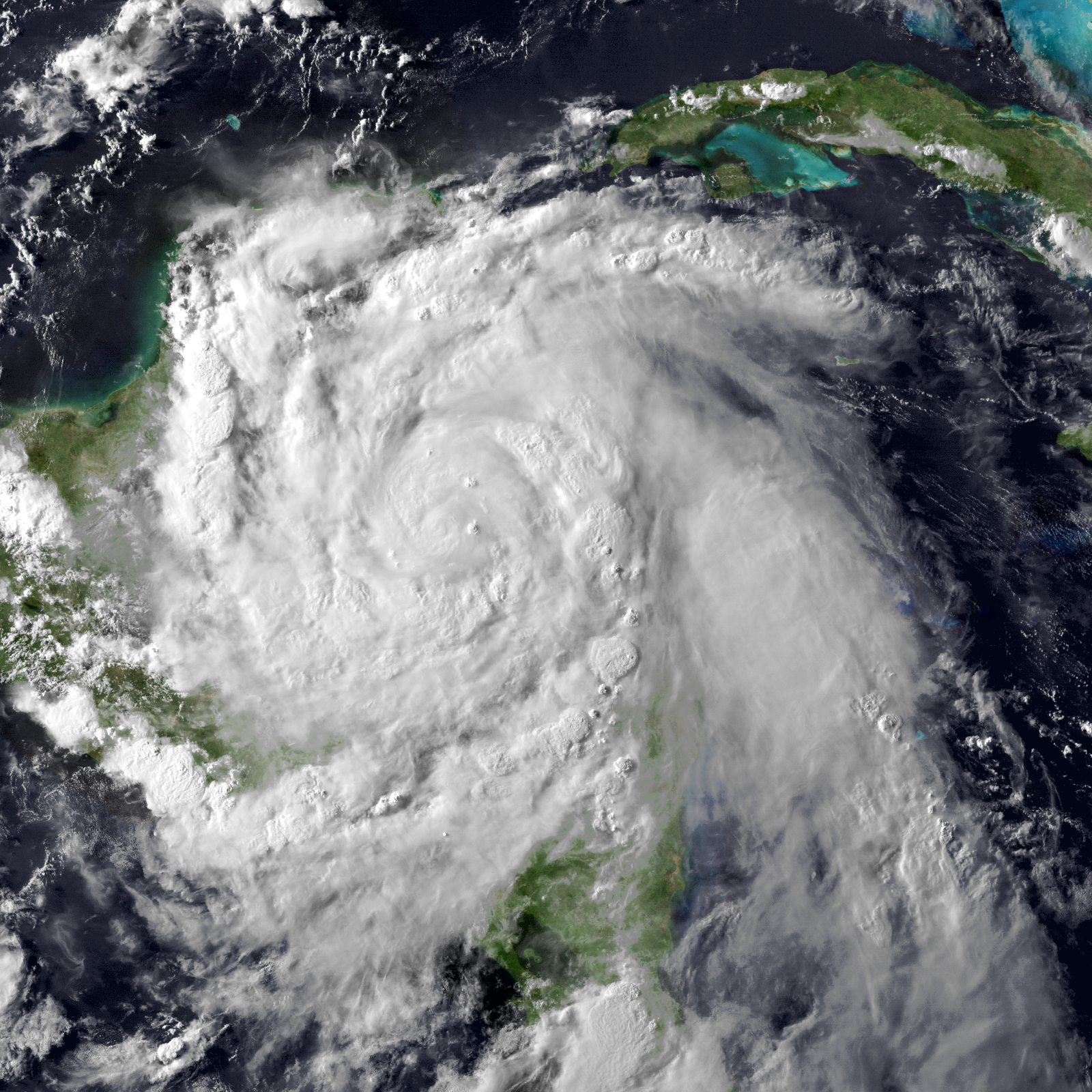
- Earl approaching Belize near peak intensity on August 3

Meteorological history
- Formed: August 2, 2016
- Dissipated: August 6, 2016

Category 1 hurricane
- 1-minute sustained (SSHWS/NWS)
- Highest winds: 85 mph (140 km/h)
- Lowest pressure: 979 mbar (hPa); 28.91 inHg

Overall effects
- Fatalities: 94 direct
- Missing: 12
- Damage: $250 million (2016 USD)
- Areas affected: Lesser Antilles, Puerto Rico, Hispaniola, Jamaica, Cayman Islands, Central America, Mexico
- IBTrACS
- Part of the 2016 Atlantic hurricane season

Hurricane Earl was the deadliest Atlantic hurricane to impact Mexico since Stan in 2005. The fifth named storm and second hurricane of the 2016 Atlantic hurricane season, Earl formed from a tropical wave south of Jamaica on August 2. The precursor to Earl brought torrential rainfall and flooding to the Lesser Antilles. Upon classification, the storm moved westward through the Caribbean Sea, brushing the north coast of Honduras. Earl strengthened into an 85 mph (140 km/h) hurricane before making landfall on Belize on August 4. It weakened while moving across the Yucatán Peninsula, but reintensified in the Bay of Campeche and followed the coastline. On August 6, Earl dissipated after moving ashore Veracruz.

Prior to Earl becoming a tropical cyclone, 13 people died in storm-related incidents across the Dominican Republic. Striking Belize as a Category 1, the hurricane caused extensive damage; losses to agriculture exceeded US$100 million. Heavy rain in Mexico triggered many landslides, several of which proved fatal in the states of Puebla, Hidalgo, and Veracruz; at least 81 people died in the country. Lesser effects were felt in neighboring countries in Central America.

== Meteorological history ==
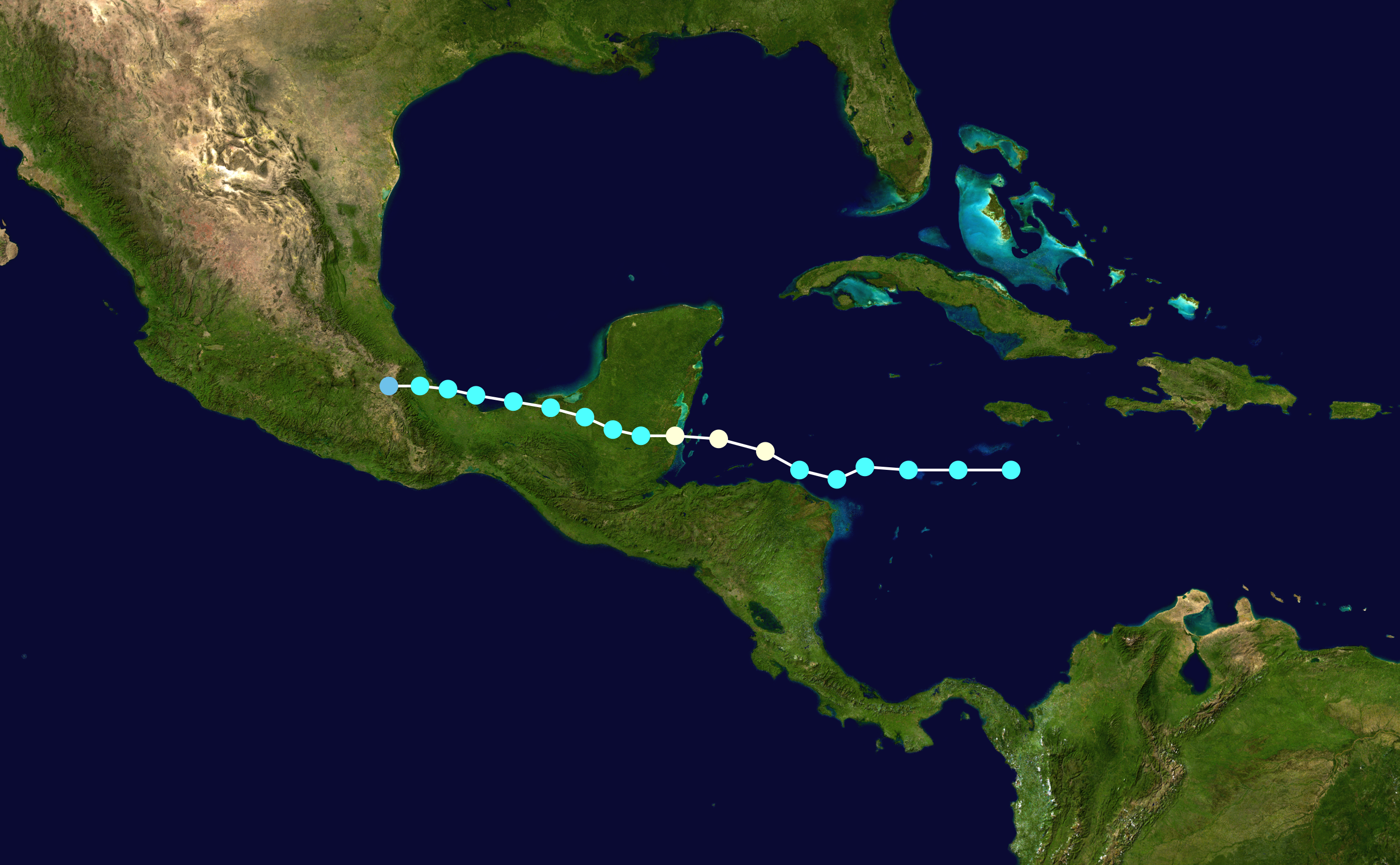
Map plotting the storm's track and intensity, according to the Saffir–Simpson scale Map key Saffir–Simpson scale Tropical depression (≤38 mph, ≤62 km/h) Tropical storm (39–73 mph, 63–118 km/h) Category 1 (74–95 mph, 119–153 km/h) Category 2 (96–110 mph, 154–177 km/h) Category 3 (111–129 mph, 178–208 km/h) Category 4 (130–156 mph, 209–251 km/h) Category 5 (≥157 mph, ≥252 km/h) Unknown Storm type Tropical cyclone Subtropical cyclone Extratropical cyclone, remnant low, tropical disturbance, or monsoon depression

On July 25, 2016, the National Hurricane Center (NHC) began monitoring a tropical wave over the eastern Atlantic along the coast of West Africa. The wave's emergence over water was accompanied by a surge in moisture, leading to the development of scattered convection. Early on July 26, a 1010 mbar (hPa; 29.83 inHg) surface low developed along the wave axis (confirmed by scatterometer data and nearby observations); however, this feature was transient and soon dissipated. Moving quickly westward, the system was expected to encounter more favorable conditions for development within three days. The rapid motion prevented initial development, resulting in poor organization of the associated convection. The thunderstorms increased on July 30 as the wave began moving through the Lesser Antilles, assisted by above-normal water temperatures and light wind shear. Despite more convective organization and the presence of strong winds, the lack of a surface circulation prevented the system from being classified as a tropical cyclone. On July 31, the wave entered the Caribbean Sea while continuing its fast forward motion.

While passing south of the Dominican Republic on August 1, the system became much better organized, producing tropical storm-force winds in its northern periphery. The fast forward motion allowed the system to develop despite an increase in upper-level wind shear, although the shear decreased as water temperatures increased along the wave's path. A Hurricane Hunters mission was scheduled to fly into the system on August 1, but it could not investigate because of mechanical problems. Early on August 2, the system passed south of Jamaica, and a Hurricane Hunters flight was able to observe a closed circulation. As a result, the NHC classified the system as Tropical Storm Earl at 16:00 UTC that day, located 215 mi (350 km) south-southeast of Grand Cayman and situated between Jamaica and northeastern Honduras.

Upon its classification, Earl was still moving quickly westward, steered by the strong flow of a ridge located over the southern United States. Earl gradually intensified after its development and developed a mid-level eye feature. The center reformed more to the south, bringing Earl close to the northern coastline of Honduras and into the Gulf of Honduras. Late on August 3, observations from the Hurricane Hunters indicated that Earl intensified into a hurricane near the Bay Islands. The eyewall, visible from the coast of Belize, was closed at times and the peak winds briefly increased to 85 mph (140 km/h). Around 06:00 UTC on August 4, Earl made landfall about 6 mi (9.7 km) south of Belize City, Belize, at this intensity.

Moving over the Yucatán Peninsula and across the mountainous terrain of northern Guatemala, Earl quickly weakened; its convection diminished, although its circulation remained well-defined. By late on August 4, the convection was limited to a small area southeast of the center, and close proximity to land was expected to limit development. On August 5, most of the circulation of Earl emerged into the southern Bay of Campeche. Later that day, a Hurricane Hunters mission indicated that the storm re-intensified and had sustained winds of 60 mph (95 km/h), reporting flight-level winds of 68 mph (109 km/h). At 02:00 UTC on August 6, Earl made its final landfall just south of Veracruz. The storm rapidly weakened over the mountains of eastern Mexico, and the circulation dissipated by 15:00 UTC. Moisture from the storm interacted with a disturbance on the Pacific coast of Mexico, which the NHC monitored as an area for development and soon developed into Tropical Storm Javier.

== Preparations ==
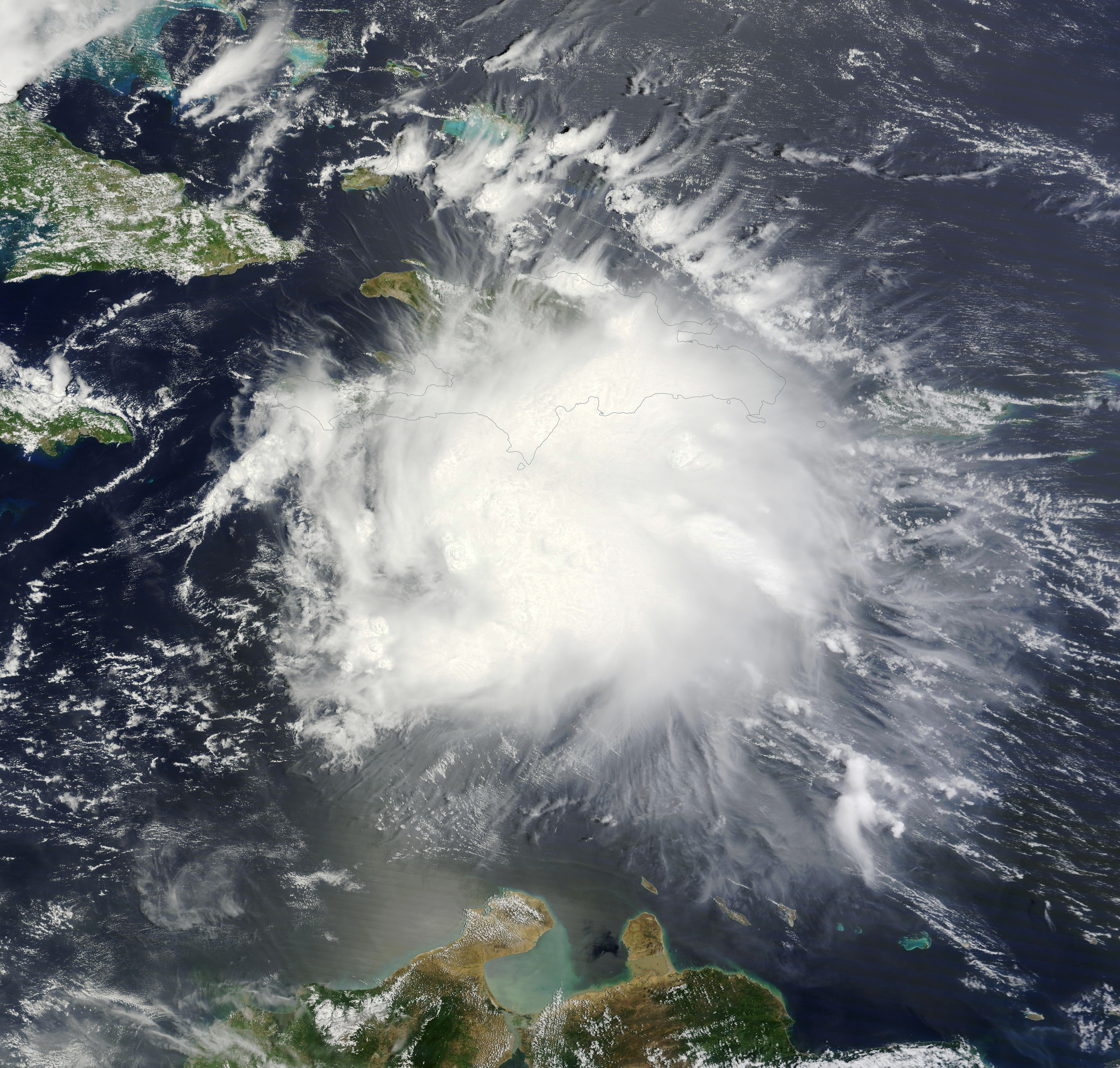
The precursor to Earl passing south of Hispaniola on August 1

Ahead of the precursor wave that became Earl, the NHC advised people in the Leeward Islands, Virgin Islands, Puerto Rico, and Hispaniola to closely monitor the system. The National Weather Service issued a flash flood watch for the Virgin Islands and Puerto Rico. In Jamaica, the government activated its National Emergency Center, which advised residents in low-lying areas and near the coast to evacuate. The Cayman Islands Government issued a tropical storm watch for all three islands. Fishermen were also advised to remain at port in both Jamaica and the Cayman Islands.

After Earl formed, the government of Honduras issued a tropical storm warning for its entire northern coastline, from Cape Gracias a Dios westward to the border with Guatemala. Two international airports along the northern coast were closed, and classes in seven departments were canceled. A red alert was issued for the offshore Bay Islands, advising residents in at-risk areas to evacuate. In northern Guatemala, about 2,000 people evacuated due to the storm, including around 100 people in Melchor de Mencos. Classes were canceled in Petén and Izabal departments, and the Mundo Maya International Airport was closed. The government of El Salvador advised residents to take caution when boating or fishing due to the storm's threat.

The governments of Belize and Mexico also issued a tropical storm warning and a hurricane watch from Belize's border with Guatemala northward to Punta Allen, which was upgraded to a hurricane warning from Belize's border with Guatemala to Costa Maya, Mexico, after Earl intensified. The Belize Red Cross Society distributed messages about the hurricane via social media. Across the country, 29 shelters were opened, housing 2,500 people. Non-essential government workers were allowed to return home to secure their property. The Philip S. W. Goldson International Airport closed during the storm's passage, but was reopened on August 4. During the storm, schools, businesses, and ports were closed, while hospitals were on standby. Officials in Mexico opened 750 emergency shelters in Quintana Roo, helping 300 families to evacuate along a river in the southeastern portion of the state. In Tabasco state, the military activated 1,500 troops for relief work, while along the Bay of Campeche, offshore petroleum companies evacuated their workers.

== Impact ==
Casualties and damage by countries
Countries	Casualties		Damage (2016 USD)	Reference(s)
Countries	Fatalities	Missing	Damage (2016 USD)	Reference(s)
Dominican Republic	13	0	—N/a	
Guatemala	0	0	$8 million	
Belize	0	0	$110 million	
Mexico	81	10	$132 million	
Offshore	0	2	—N/a	
Totals:	94	12	$250 million	

=== Caribbean Islands and Central America ===
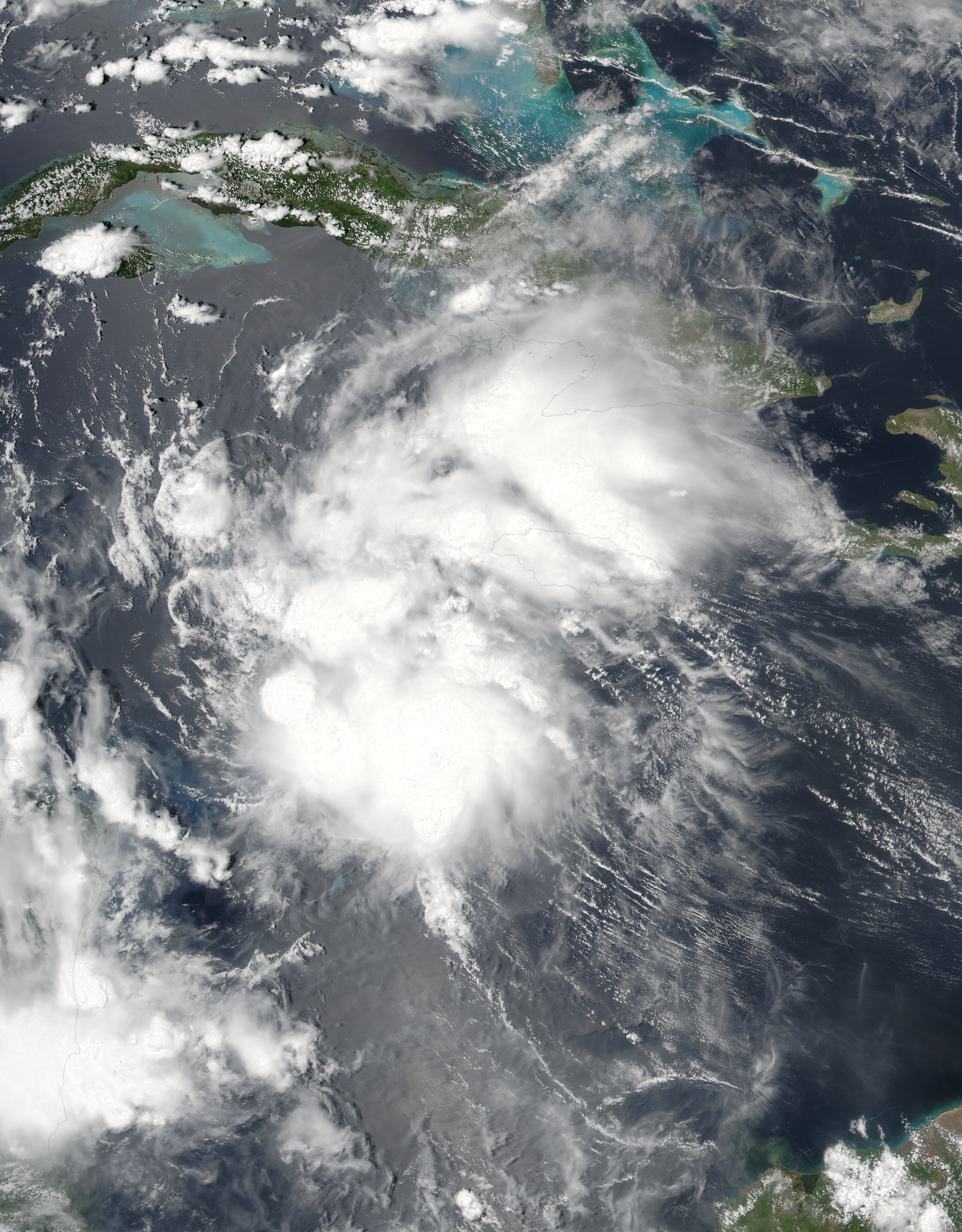
Tropical Storm Earl intensifying over the Caribbean Sea on August 2

The precursor to Earl brought strong winds and heavy rainfall to the Dominican Republic. These meteorological conditions interrupted traffic, flooded areas, and sparked landslides. Along the northern coast near Nagua, the system's strong winds knocked a power line onto a bus, causing a fire that killed six people and injured 12. A boat with nine excursionists capsized in Samaná Bay inside Los Haitises National Park; a woman and the captain were found alive, while seven of the excursionists died.

Heavy rain caused flooding in parts of Montego Bay, Jamaica.

Despite storm warnings, a lobster boat capsized along northern Honduras with 83 people aboard, with two people missing. The storm's fringes damaged three houses in Cortés Department, after heavy rainfall was reported along the coast. One person was injured in San Pedro Sula.

In northern Guatemala, Earl dropped heavy rainfall that reached 7.0 in (177 mm) in Melchor de Mencos in the country's northern Petén Department. In the department's capital Flores, the rainfall totaled 5.7 in (146 mm), which represents 80% of the typical August rainfall there. The rains increased the water level of the Chixoy River, which reached a depth of 3.4 m (11 ft). Severe flooding knocked down trees and swelled rivers, which wrecked a bridge in Melchor de Mencos. The rains also knocked down two main power lines in Flores, which was the main power line leading into Petén Department, leaving 63,00 people without power. At least 162 homes and 1,250 acres (510 hectares) of crops were damaged, with 200 farms suffering total losses. A total of 1,046 people were affected, of whom 500 were rendered homeless across the country.

=== Belize ===
Infrared satellite loop of Earl making landfall in Belize on August 4

The combination of 9–12 in (230–300 mm) in rainfall and a storm surge flooded coastal areas across central and northern Belize, including the cayes. During the storm, the City Emergency Management Organization, in addition to the Belize Defence Force, responded to over 100 search and rescue requests. Flash flooding occurred in Cayo District, forcing additional residents to evacuate. Water levels remained high along rivers and dams for up to a week after the storm. Hurricane-force winds caused widespread infrastructure damage that affected power lines, transformers, and roofs. Two cell sites were destroyed, restricting cellular data service. The only part of the country that did not lose power during the storm was the northern portion of Belize. The resulting heavy debris blocked thoroughfares in affected areas, and bridges were damaged in San Ignacio and Calla Creek. Overall damage was heaviest in the country's central and western regions where several rivers burst their banks. Preliminary surveys indicate that Earl damaged or destroyed approximately 2,000 homes in Belize, affecting 10,000 people. Agricultural damage across the country was estimated at over US$100 million, and overall damage was estimated at BZ$220 million (US$110 million). According to the final report of the International Red Cross, 10,355 people in 2,071 families were affected.

On the offshore San Pedro Town, the storm damaged businesses reliant on tourism, such as docks and scuba shops. Despite the damage from the storm effects, the tourism industry grew in 2016 over the previous year. About 80% of the houses in Belize District were flooded, which is where Belize City is located. Over 1,000 people were displaced in the city, causing overcrowding in 13 shelters. In Belize City, all power and some communications were down during the storm, which made it difficult to relay the city's conditions to the outside world. Flooding in the city damaged many houses made of wood.

=== Mexico ===
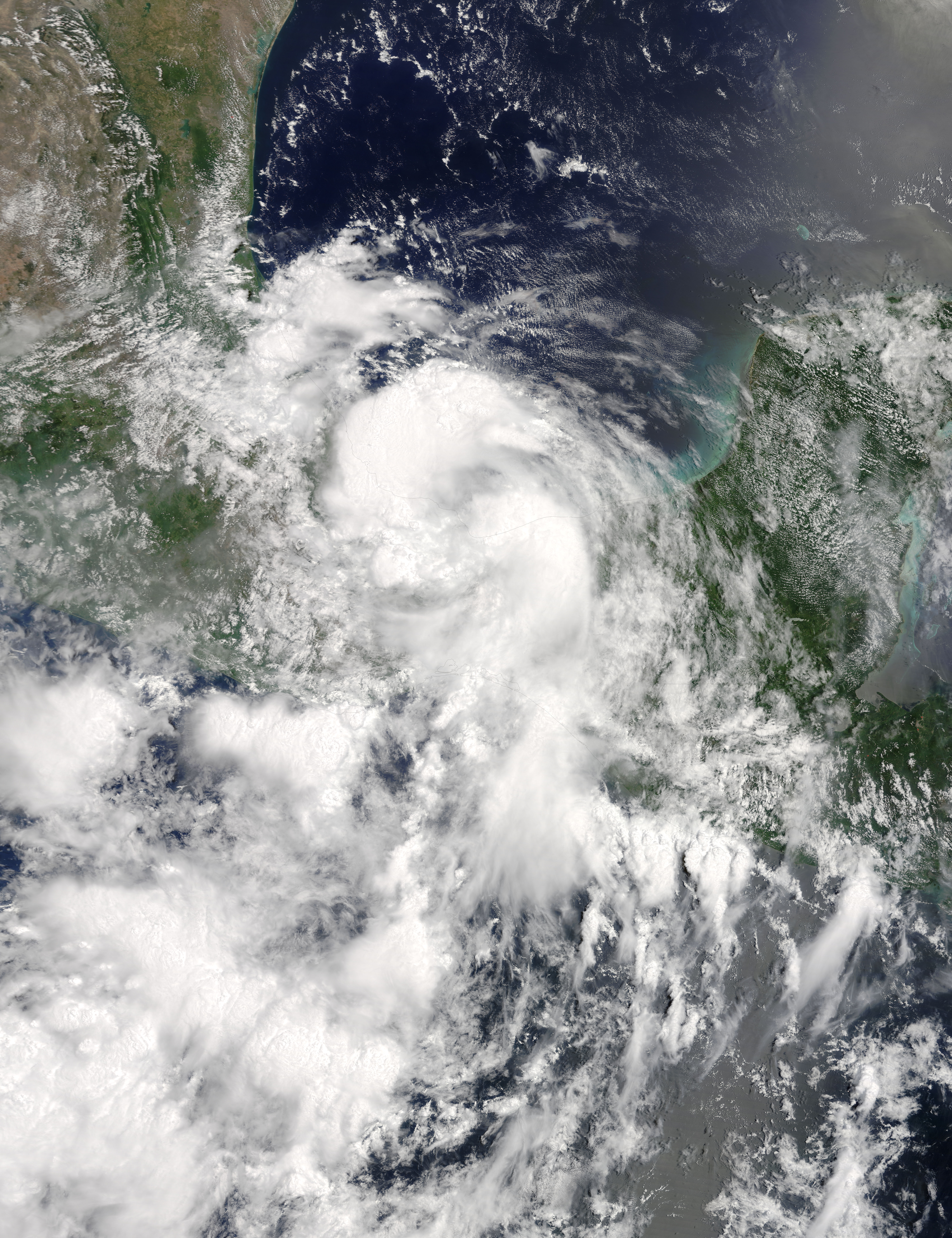
Tropical Storm Earl near its second landfall on August 5

While Earl was over the Yucatán Peninsula, it produced wind gusts of 53 mph (85 km/h) in Ciudad del Carmen, Campeche. The interaction between Earl and a large low-level cyclonic gyre produced torrential rainfall across southern Mexico. Rainfall in Mexico peaked at 13.28 in (337.2 mm) in Manzanillo, and 12.41 in (315.2 mm) in Huauchinango. A station in Chiapas recorded about 7 in (180 mm) of rainfall. The rains caused landslides across the mountainous areas of eastern Mexico that buried areas in several feet with mud, killing at least 54 people, including 18 children. This made Earl the deadliest Atlantic hurricane to impact Mexico since Hurricane Stan in 2005.

The floods and landslides heavily damaged roads in mountainous and isolated areas of Veracruz and Puebla states, forcing 1,700 families to leave their homes to shelters. In Veracruz, the storm and the resultant landslides damaged 6,300 homes and 26 roadways, affecting 32,500 people and killing 13. Floods isolated 18 villages in the southern and central portion of the state. Sixty-six schools sustained varying degrees of damage. Landslides in northern Puebla killed at least 41 people after several homes were covered. At least 10 people were reported missing in the state. In Chicahuaxtla, landslides damaged 350 homes and blocked roads to the village, cutting off power and water supply. The municipality of Huauchinango was hardest-hit after a month's worth of rain fell in approximately 24 hours. At least 13 people died in Huauchinango, including 7 children. A landslide in Xaltepec killed 11 people, and three fatalities occurred in Tlaola. Damage in Huauchinango exceeded 100 million pesos (US$5.33 million). The storm wrecked two bridges and damaged several highways in Puebla. In Hidalgo, one death also occurred, although the cause of death was not conclusively linked to Earl. At least ten homes were destroyed in the state. Total damage in Mexico is estimated to be at least US$132 million.

== Aftermath ==
In northern Guatemala, 466 people required government aid due to damage from Earl. Officials provided 15 tons of supplies to the victims, including food, water, and blankets.

On August 4, the government of Belize declared a 30-day state of emergency. The government focused their initial disaster response on search and rescue missions, medical care, helping storm victims, cleaning debris from roads, and restoring utilities. The country's Minister of Works sent employees to clear blocked highways, and the government hired residents to help clean the streets from debris. Workers quickly restored 75% of the power outages within a day of the hurricane's passage, which increased to 99% by August 11. All emergency shelters closed on August 12, and the remaining displaced families were provided rent-free lodging for up to three months. The National Relief and Supplies Management Committee provided food, water, cleaning supplies, tarps, and mattresses to affected residents, helping 8,000 people by August 10. Damage to water systems resulted in decreased water pressure in buildings, possibly contaminating the nation's water supply. As a result, the Health Ministry advised residents to treat drinking water, and officials worked to repair water systems in the week after the storm's passage. The Belize Water Service sent a truck to the Old Northern Highway. About 90% of residents in damaged houses enacted their own repairs, with the help of neighbors. To assist with disaster relief, the European Union donated €50,000 to Belize through the Disaster Relief Emergency Fund of the International Federation of Red Cross and Red Crescent Societies. Taiwan sent US$100,000 to the country. The Inter-American Development Bank provided US$200,000 to Belize to purchase food, medicine, and supplies to rebuild. Belize Telemedia Limited also donated US$50,000 toward disaster relief, and Norwegian Cruise Line donated BZ$100,000. The Belize government received US$261,073 from the Caribbean Catastrophe Risk Insurance Facility, having first bought an excess rainfall policy in June 2016. UNICEF acted as the primary coordinating agency for the United Nations, its first emergency in that capacity. The agency provided the government with $35,000 toward clean-up, 430 family hygiene kits, and emergency SMSs to be distributed by phone.

In eastern Mexico, a state of emergency was declared in three municipalities in Quintana Roo and two in Chiapas. Puebla governor Rafael Moreno Valle and municipal mayors declared a state of emergency for 29 municipalities by August 12, while in Veracruz, 87 municipalities were declared states of emergency. Mexico's Secretary for Social Development provided $3.6 million (MXN, US$190,800) to three communities in Veracruz toward temporary work programs. The country's Ministry of Public Education provided $200 million (MXN, US$11 million) toward rebuilding schools damaged by Earl. Soup kitchens opened in the disaster zones to help storm victims. In the landslide-struck regions of eastern Mexico, a crew of 600 soldiers and rescue workers searched the mountains for storm victims, with the assistance of sniffer dogs. Supplies were distributed throughout Puebla, including water, sanitary products, and clothing. Officials sent trucks containing food, water, and oil to the hard-hit town of Huauchinango, enough supplies for 1,800 people for ten days. The Mexican Red Cross brought ambulances to the isolated community Chicauaxtla, where they helped assess the scope of the storm damage. The Inter-American Development Bank provided US$200,000 to purchase blankets, food, and cleaning supplies for storm victims. Other assistance included CHF143,000 from the International Red Cross and US$50,000 from the United Nations Office for the Coordination of Humanitarian Affairs.

== See also ==
- Weather of 2016
- Tropical cyclones in 2016
- Other tropical cyclones named Earl
- Hurricane Diana (1990) – another hurricane which resulted in a major flood disaster in Mexico
- Hurricane Keith (2000) – a comparable hurricane that struck Belize
- Hurricane Ernesto (2012) – struck the Yucatán peninsula and eastern Mexico before reforming in the eastern Pacific Ocean
- Hurricane Richard (2010) – late-season hurricane that struck central Belize
- Hurricane Franklin (2017) – a similar storm that struck Mexico twice the following year
- Hurricane Nana (2020) – A hurricane that made a similar track 4 years later
