= Western Head, Nova Scotia =

Community in Nova Scotia, Canada

Western Head in Nova Scotia

Western Head is a community in the Canadian province of Nova Scotia, located in the Region of Queens Municipality. The Meteorological Service of Canada maintains a weather station in Western Head ID: CWWE. A lighthouse and fog station, the Western Head Lighthouse, is located here at 43.989109°N 64.661495°W. The lighthouse is an octagonal concrete tower with an aluminum lantern.

Western Head is prone to tropical storms and hurricanes that track up the East Coast. However, effects are usually quick and minimal as the cool waters may weaken the storm, and storms usually move very quickly across Western Head. For example, Hurricane Earl made landfall near Western Head as a large Category One hurricane in 2010.
