= List of storms named Earl =

The name Earl has been used for eight tropical cyclones in the Atlantic Ocean.

- Hurricane Earl (1980) — a Category 1 hurricane that drifted over the central Atlantic Ocean without affecting land.
- Hurricane Earl (1986) — a Category 2 hurricane that drifted over the central Atlantic Ocean without affecting land.
- Tropical Storm Earl (1992) — headed towards eastern Florida then veered away; no damage was reported.
- Hurricane Earl (1998) — an asymmetrical Category 2 hurricane that struck the Florida Panhandle, causing approximately US$79 million in damage and 3 fatalities.
- Tropical Storm Earl (2004) — traversed the Windward Islands, then degenerated to an open tropical wave; this remnant eventually became Hurricane Frank in the eastern Pacific Ocean.
- Hurricane Earl (2010) — a strong, long-lived Category 4 hurricane that affected most of the United States east coast and Canada.
- Hurricane Earl (2016) — struck Belize as a minimal Category 1 hurricane, then made a second landfall near Veracruz, Mexico as a tropical storm, causing US$250 million in damage and 94 deaths.
- Hurricane Earl (2022) – a Category 2 hurricane that drifted over the central Atlantic Ocean, caused 2 fatalities in Puerto Rico when it neared the island as a tropical storm.
