= Hurricane Earl (2010) =

Category 4 Atlantic hurricane in 2010

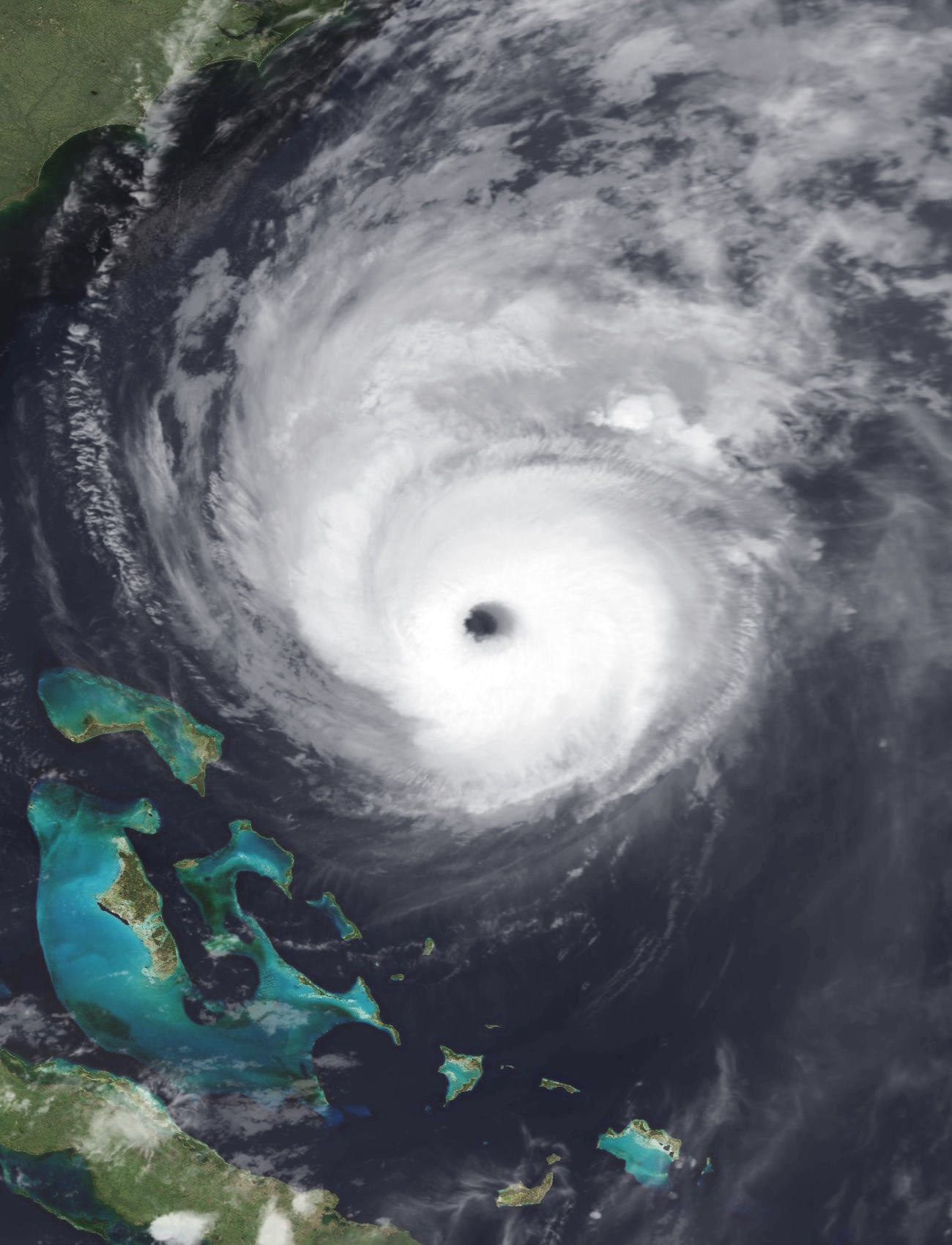
- Earl at peak intensity near the Bahamas on September 2

Meteorological history
- Formed: August 25, 2010
- Extratropical: September 4, 2010
- Dissipated: September 5, 2010

Category 4 major hurricane
- 1-minute sustained (SSHWS/NWS)
- Highest winds: 145 mph (230 km/h)
- Lowest pressure: 927 mbar (hPa); 27.37 inHg

Overall effects
- Fatalities: 8
- Damage: $45 million (2010 USD)
- Areas affected: Leeward Islands, Puerto Rico, Bahamas, East Coast of the United States, Atlantic Canada
- IBTrACS
- Part of the 2010 Atlantic hurricane season

Hurricane Earl was a long-lived and powerful Cape Verde hurricane that impacted the Leeward Islands, Puerto Rico, the Bahamas, the East Coast of the United States, and Atlantic Canada. The fifth named storm of the season, Earl originated from a tropical wave to west of the Cape Verde Islands on August 25, 2010. Tracking nearly due west, the system attained tropical storm intensity within hours of genesis. After maintaining winds of 50 mph (80 km/h) for nearly two days, Earl began to strengthen as it neared the Lesser Antilles. The storm intensified into a hurricane on August 29 and later a major hurricane on August 30 as it brushed the Leeward Islands. A temporary weakening trend took place as Earl moved northwestward, contributed to moderate southwesterly wind shear, but intensification later resumed by September 1. Once reorganized, Earl reached its peak winds of 145 mph (233 km/h). Executing a gradual curve to the northeast, the hurricane slowly weakened over decreasing sea surface temperatures; the storm's center passed roughly 85 mi (137 km) east of Cape Hatteras, North Carolina on September 3. Accelerating northeastward, the system briefly weakened to a tropical storm before reattaining hurricane strength as it made landfall near Western Head, Nova Scotia. After traversing the peninsula, the hurricane became extratropical and was later absorbed by a larger low pressure area on September 6, while located north of Newfoundland.

In the Lesser Antilles, the storm brought strong winds, damaging houses and toppling trees, signs, and power lines, resulting in hundreds of thousands of electrical outages. Heavy rainfall led to flooding, inundating streets and leaving waist-deep water on some islands. One death occurred in Antigua and Barbuda when a person was electrocuted while attempting to restore power. The region was inflicted with at least $40.8 million (2010 USD) in damage. Along the coast of the Eastern United States, tropical storm-force winds affected portions of North Carolina and Massachusetts; however, little damage resulted, totaling about $3.8 million in the Outer Banks. Six fatalities were confirmed in the United States as a result of rip currents and rough seas; three in Florida, two in New Jersey and one in Massachusetts. In Nova Scotia, Canada, where Earl made landfall as a Category 1 hurricane, one person drowned and hundreds of thousands of people lost power for days.

== Meteorological history ==
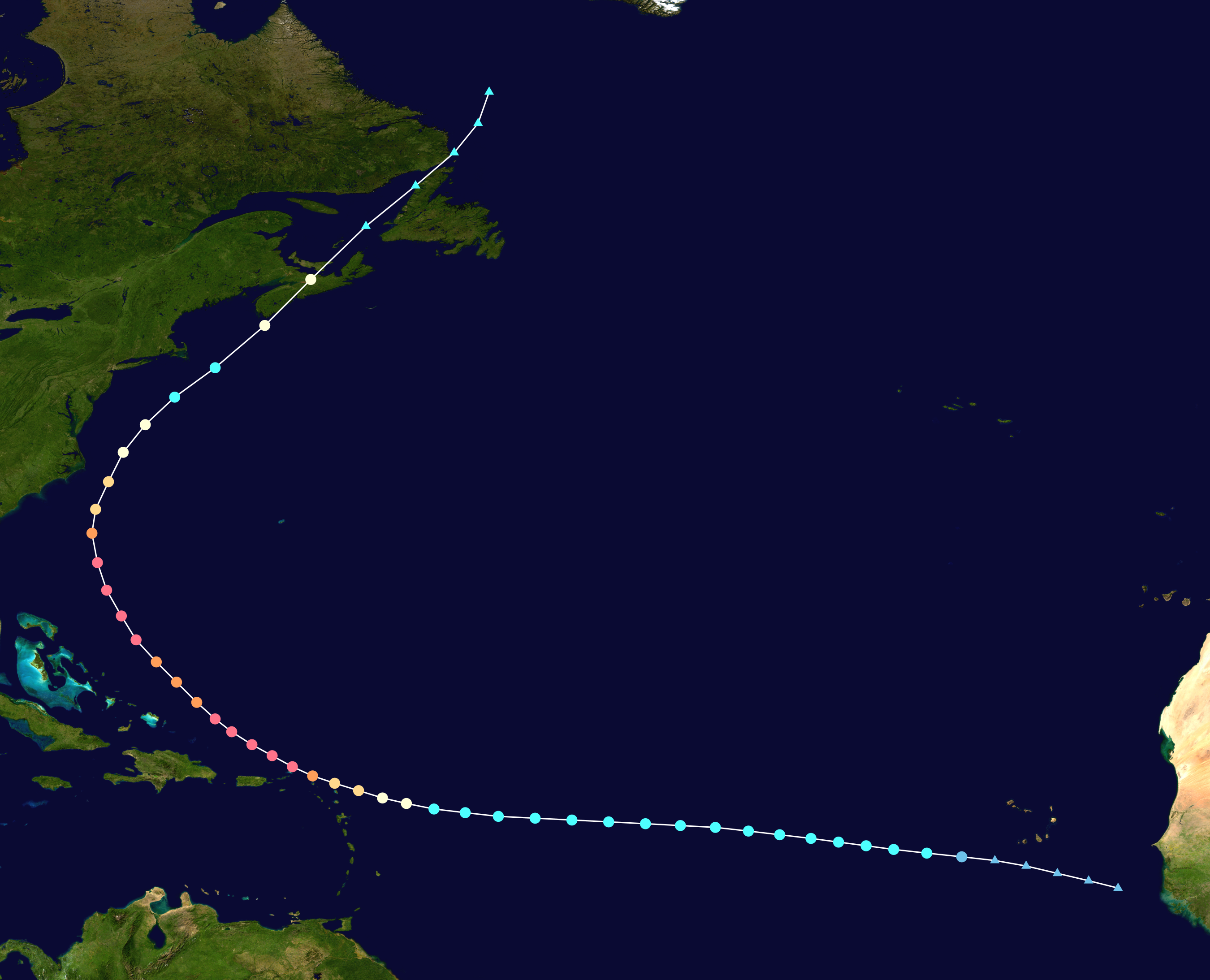
Map plotting the storm's track and intensity, according to the Saffir–Simpson scale Map key Saffir–Simpson scale Tropical depression (≤38 mph, ≤62 km/h) Tropical storm (39–73 mph, 63–118 km/h) Category 1 (74–95 mph, 119–153 km/h) Category 2 (96–110 mph, 154–177 km/h) Category 3 (111–129 mph, 178–208 km/h) Category 4 (130–156 mph, 209–251 km/h) Category 5 (≥157 mph, ≥252 km/h) Unknown Storm type Tropical cyclone Subtropical cyclone Extratropical cyclone, remnant low, tropical disturbance, or monsoon depression

Earl was detected from an vigorous tropical wave that emerged on early August 22. The wave formed in a well-organized area of low pressure and moved into the Atlantic Ocean as early August 23. After moving off the west coast of Africa, a surface low started to develop near the area of thunderstorms. The surface low was able to organize the area of thunderstorms, allowing deep convection to occur near it. Because of the area's increasing thunderstorm organization, the National Hurricane Center (NHC) indicated on August 24 that the system had a 90% chance of becoming a tropical depression within the next 48 hours. 24 hours later, the NHC classified the system as Tropical Depression Seven at around 1500 UTC on August 25, while it was located about 430 mi (690 km) west of the southernmost Cape Verde Islands. Six hours later, at about 2100 UTC, the system's maximum sustained winds were estimated to be 40 mph (64 km/h). Accordingly, the depression was declared to have become the fifth tropical storm of the season, and received the name Earl.

Earl was forecast to head westward while gradually strengthening under the influence of low wind shear and warm ocean temperatures. However, dry air caught in Earl's circulation precluded additional intensification, causing the storm to maintain 45 mph (72 km/h) maximum sustained winds for 36 hours. On August 29, the storm resumed gradual intensification, even though wind shear increased due to the outflow from nearby Hurricane Danielle. The wind shear caused Earl's low level center of circulation to become exposed, limiting Earl's intensification to 60 mph (97 km/h) maximum sustained winds during the following 12 hours. As the storm neared the Leeward Islands, convection increased around Earl and defined banding features formed. Around 1230 UTC, Earl strengthened into a hurricane roughly 365 mi (587 km) east of the northern Leeward Islands. Rapid intensification ensued throughout the day as a 35 mi (56 km) wide eye became apparent in radar imagery from Guadeloupe.

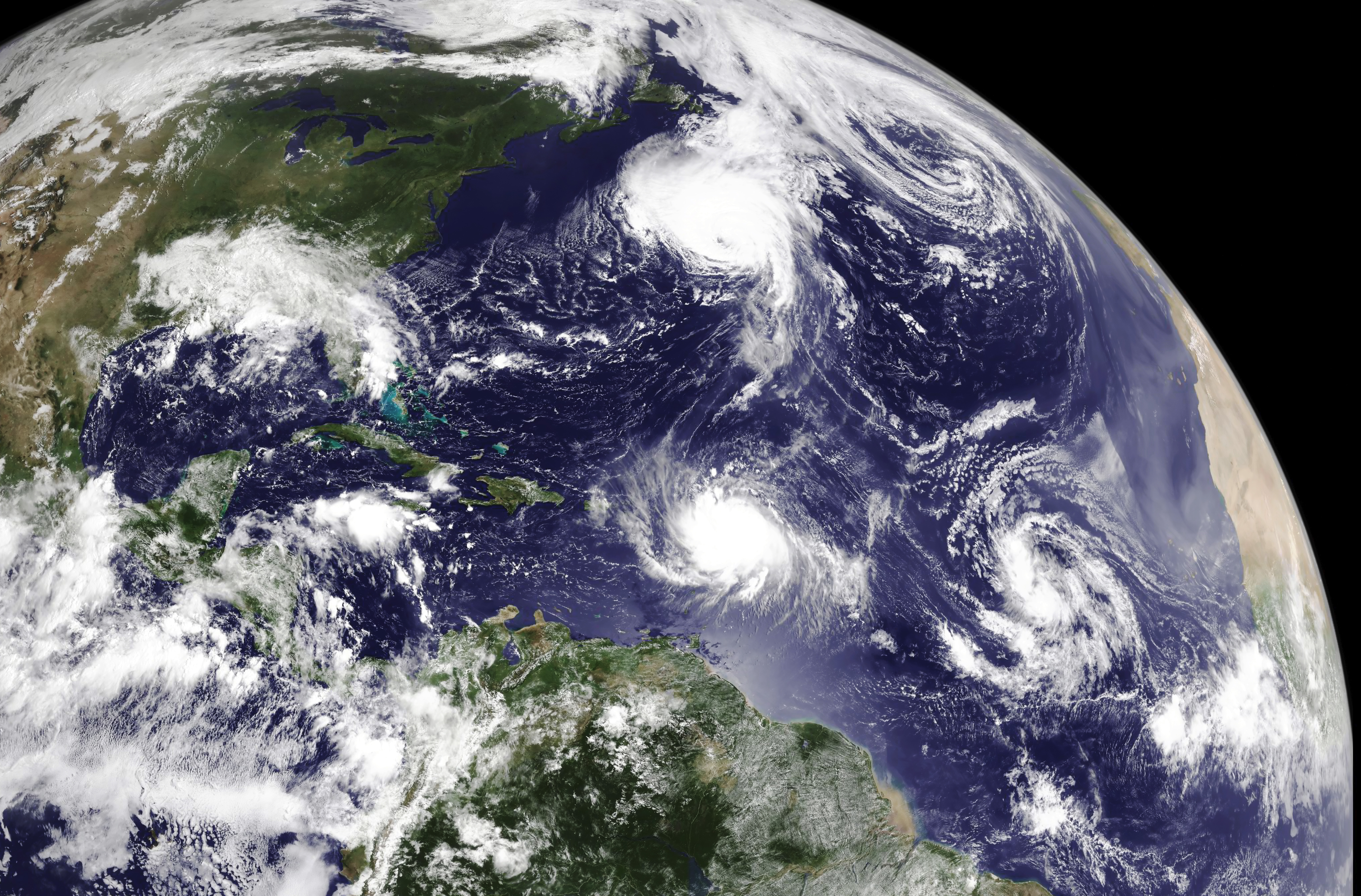
Satellite image of the North Atlantic Ocean on August 29 depicting hurricanes Danielle (top) and Earl (middle) as well as two tropical waves that eventually developed into tropical storms Fiona and Gaston (right)

Hurricane Earl's outflow steadily improved through August 30 and sustained winds rose above 100 mph (160 km/h), making Earl a Category 2 storm. Around 1200 UTC, the center of Earl passed roughly 25 mi (40 km) east-northeast of St. Martin with sustained winds of 110 mph (180 km/h). Several hours later, the storm further intensified into a major hurricane. That afternoon, Earl became a Category 4 hurricane, attaining winds of 135 mph (217 km/h) before leveling out in intensity. A northwestward track began to become apparent by this time as the system neared the southwestern periphery of a subtropical ridge over the Atlantic Ocean. Early on August 31, an eyewall replacement cycle, a process in which a storm's eye dissipates and is replaced by a larger one, began to take place. Despite increasing wind shear, the system maintained its intensity through September 1, when it briefly weakened to a Category 3 system. Gradual strengthening took place throughout the day as the eye became better defined and convection deepened around the center. Additionally, the storm began to turn northward in response to the ridge over the Atlantic and a strong trough over the Great Lakes. Hurricane Earl later attained its peak intensity during the morning of September 2 with winds of 145 mph (233 km/h) and a barometric pressure of 928 mbar (hPa; 27.40 inHg).

During the afternoon of September 2, Earl finally succumbed to the effects of increased shear and cooler water temperatures. Embedded within the mid-latitude westerlies, a gradual northeasterly turn was expected over the following day, preventing Earl from making landfall along the East Coast of the United States. Around 0600 UTC the next morning, the storm made its closest approach to the United States, passing roughly 85 mi (137 km) east of Cape Hatteras, North Carolina with winds of 105 mph (169 km/h). Further weakening took place throughout the day as convection weakened and the eye dissipated. Earl was downgraded to a tropical storm that evening; however, the central pressure remained at an unusually low 958 mbar (hPa; 28.29 inHg). At the same time, the storm made its closet approach to Massachusetts, passing roughly 90 mi (140 km) southeast of Nantucket. Continuing northeastward, Earl neared the Canadian Maritimes, re-strengthening slightly and regaining hurricane intensity as it approached the region. The storm made landfall in Queens County near Western Head, Nova Scotia around 1400 UTC on September 4, as a Category 1 hurricane with sustained winds of 75 mph (121 km/h). After crossing Prince Edward Island, the storm entered the Gulf of Saint Lawrence. There, the system finally transitioned into a post-tropical storm as its windfield became asymmetric and the eastern portion of the circulation became associated with a frontal system. During the afternoon of September 5, the remnants of Earl were absorbed by a mid-latitude low roughly 205 mi (330 km) north-northeast of St. Anthony, Newfoundland.

=== Research ===
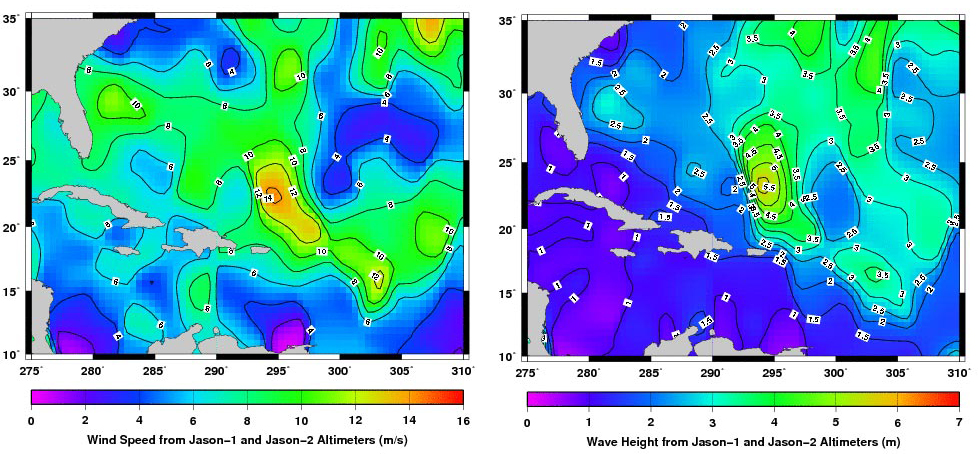
Wave Height and Wind Speed of Hurricane Earl as measured by a three-day composite of data from NASA's Jason-1 and Ocean Surface Topography Mission (OSTM)/Jason-2 satellites, from Aug. 29 to Sept. 1, 2010.

As Hurricane Earl tracked along the East Coast of the United States, a new program, the Genesis and Rapid Intensification Processes (GRIP), was launched. A former military aircraft, a WB-57 able to reach an altitude of 60,000 ft (18,000 m), carrying 15 new instruments was flown into the storm. Additionally, routine Hurricane Hunter missions were flown into Earl, a DC-8 and the first use of an unmanned research drone. Combined, these missions made Hurricane Earl the most studied tropical cyclone in history, according to Tim Miller, the lead scientist in GRIP. The outcome of the extensive research allowed for substantially improved forecasts during the latter part of Earl's existence. As compared to a similar storm, Hurricane Floyd in 1999, warnings covered roughly 1,500 mi (2,400 km) less coastline, saving residents and businesses roughly $1 billion in evacuation losses.

In Anegada, a geological study, focusing on beach deposits from two significant wash-out events between 1650 and 1800, was given additional research material by the storm. Deposits left behind by the major hurricane were substantially less than the time period being studied. This led researchers to determine that a tsunami was likely the cause, rather than a hurricane. This also allowed for a connection to the 1755 Lisbon earthquake to be confirmed.

== Preparations ==
=== Caribbean ===
On August 27, France issued a tropical storm watch for the French side of Saint Martin and Saint Barthélemy. The next day, Antigua and Barbuda and the Netherlands Antilles issued tropical storm watches for Antigua, Barbuda, Montserrat, St Kitts and Nevis and Anguilla and for Sint Maarten, Saba and Sint Eustatius. Hours later, most of the watches were upgraded to tropical storm warnings; a tropical storm watch was also issued for the United States Virgin Islands. By August 28, hurricane warnings were in place for the areas between Anguilla and Montserrat; hurricane watches were declared for the U.S. and British Virgin Islands as well as Puerto Rico. As Earl moved closer to the northeastern Caribbean, warnings were extended westward through the Virgin Islands.

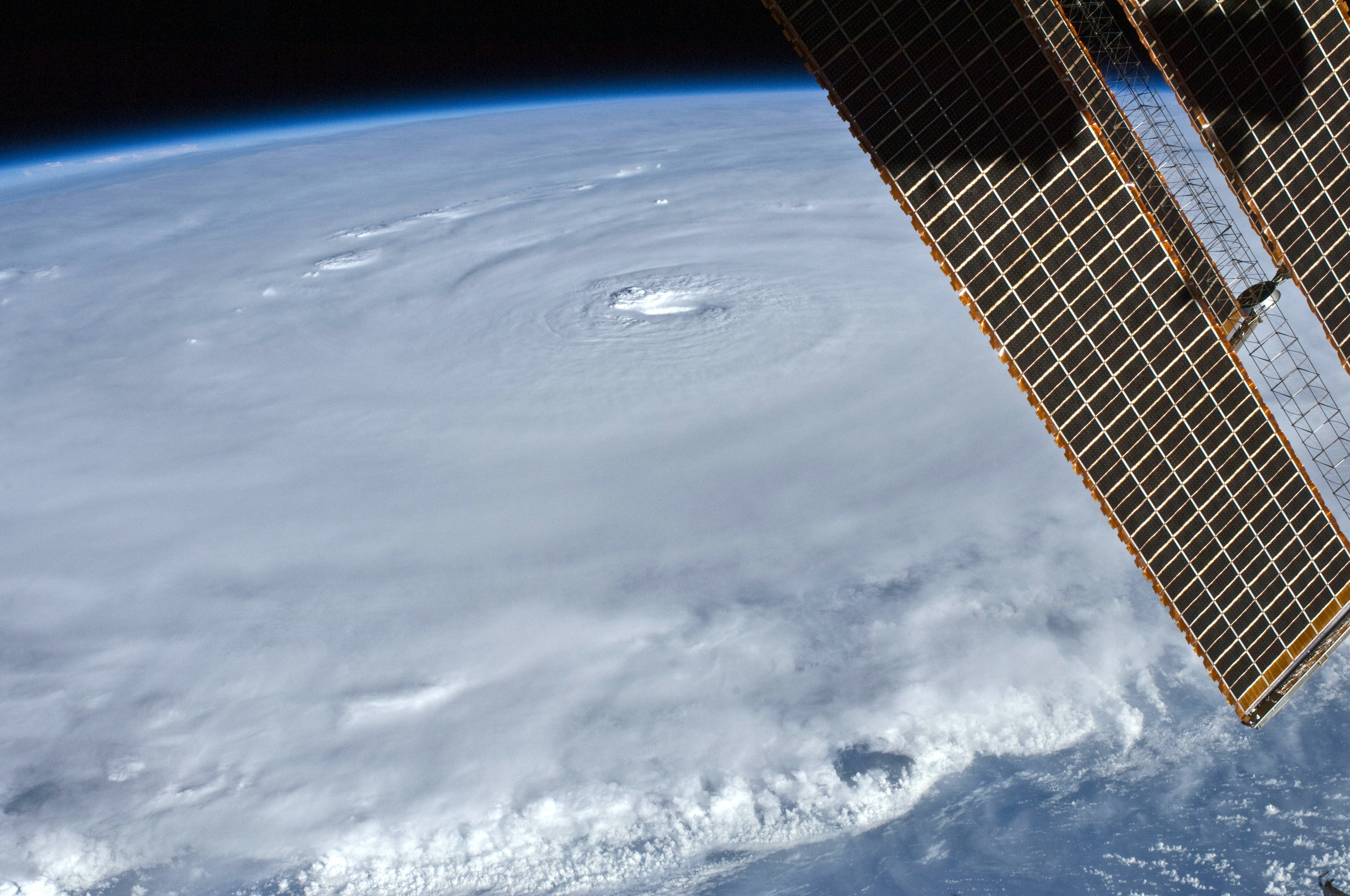
Hurricane Earl as seen from the International Space Station on August 30

Throughout the Leeward Islands, heavy rains produced by the storm flooded low-lying areas. During the late morning of August 30, some of the hurricane warnings were replaced by tropical storm warnings; the Turks and Caicos islands were also placed under a tropical storm watch. Several hours later, all warnings for Antigua and Barbuda were discontinued. That afternoon, all hurricane advisories were discontinued as Earl moved away from the Caribbean islands. By August 31, the remaining advisories for the Caribbean were discontinued; the Turks and Caicos were also placed under a tropical storm warning. Early on September 1, the Government of the Bahamas discontinued all advisories in relation to Hurricane Earl.

Beginning on August 28, local governments placed emergency agencies on standby for possible damage from Hurricane Earl. Press releases were made to the public in order to give sufficient time for preparations. The following day, emergency shelters were opened on Anguilla, Antigua, Barbuda, Montserrat, St. Kitts, Nevis and the Virgin Islands. On St. Kitts and Nevis, the Robert L. Bradshaw International Airport and Vance W. Amory International Airport were shut down and scheduled to re-open the following day. All emergency services were placed on standby on Anguilla, Antigua and Barbuda. Prior to Earl's arrival in the Leeward Islands, the Leeward Islands Air Transport canceled 42 flights to and from the region. The V. C. Bird International Airport on Antigua was closed on August 29 and set to reopen after the storm passes. Although not in the direct path of Hurricane Earl, officials in the Dominican Republic prompted evacuations of coastal towns and canceled flights across the country.

=== United States ===
This animation shows the storm's progress and transformation between September 1 and September 3, 2010.

As Hurricane Earl moved away from the eastern Caribbean on August 31, the NHC began issuing storm watches for the United States East Coast. That day, a hurricane watch was issued for areas of North Carolina between Surf City and the Virginia border. A tropical storm watch was also issued south of this area to Cape Fear. The next day, a hurricane warning was issued for parts of the North Carolina coastline between Bogue Banks to the Virginia border and the hurricane watch was extended northward to Cape Henlopen, Delaware. Further watches and warnings were issued throughout the day, covering an increasingly large region of the coastline. By September 2, these advisories encompassed much of the East Coast from Bogue Banks, North Carolina to the United States-Canada border in northern Maine. According to the NHC, Earl was the first major hurricane to threaten New England since Hurricane Bob in 1991. Cape Cod, Massachusetts was placed under a hurricane warning by this time and this remained in place until Earl was downgraded to a tropical storm the following day. The advisories gradually lessened in coverage as the storm moved away from the United States. The last warning in northern Maine remained in effect until the morning of September 4 when Earl approached landfall in Nova Scotia.

On August 30, emergency officials in Massachusetts began early-stage emergency plans, ensuring that all communities had shelters, generators, sand bags and other disaster prevention materials. Officials in New York and New Jersey also responded to the threat of Earl. Evacuation plans were readied for Long Island and New York City; emergency officers in New Jersey also discussed the possibility of evacuating residents from low-lying areas along the coastline. Having experienced a fatality from a distant Hurricane Danielle earlier in August, officials in Maryland took the threat of Earl seriously. An estimated 250,000 people were expected to travel to the region for the Labor Day weekend, increasing the risk of loss of life from rip currents. Daily conference calls between state officials also began on August 30. In Suffolk County and Nassau County on Long Island, emergency officials prepared for winds in excess of 40 mph (64 km/h) and warned that evacuations were possible. The Long Island Rail Road suspended service to the Hamptons before the storm.

An administrator of the Federal Emergency Management Agency, Craig Fugate, cautioned that Earl's approach warranted a reminder for evacuation plans to be updated for the U.S. east coast, noting "It wouldn't take much to have the storm come ashore somewhere on the coast. The message is for everyone to pay attention."

On August 31, mandatory evacuations began on North Carolina's Ocracoke Island. "I don't remember the last time there was a mandatory evacuation order for the island," stated Commissioner Kenneth Collier of Hyde County. Mandatory evacuations were also issued for Hatteras Island on September 1, with a total of 30,000 residents and visitors affected. On September 1, state of emergency declarations were issued by the governors of Maryland, North Carolina, and Virginia. Naval Station Norfolk was put under orders to be ready to depart port within 24 hours if necessary. The following day, Governor Deval Patrick declared a state of emergency for Massachusetts. NSTAR deployed crews from Michigan to Cape Cod. The ferry to Nantucket was stopping service Friday morning. Chatham, Massachusetts was under a voluntary evacuation order. Several school districts in Rhode Island released students from school early on September 3, as well as Bristol-Warren and Cumberland school Districts, which closed schools in anticipation of Hurricane Earl.

=== Canada ===
On September 2, the Canadian Hurricane Center issued a hurricane watch for areas in Nova Scotia between Medway Harbour and Digby as well as a tropical storm watch from the edges of the hurricane watch to Ecum Secum and Fort Lawrence. Later that day, the tropical storm watch was expanded northward to Point Tupper and a new one was issued for Prince Edward Island and parts of eastern New Brunswick. Early on September 3, a tropical storm warning was issued for areas between Lismore and Ecum Secum as well as Prince Edward Island. The following day, the hurricane watch in Nova Scotia was shifted to include areas between Ecum Secum and Point Tupper and the tropical storm watch in New Brunswick was discontinued. Later on September 4, much of Nova Scotia was under a tropical storm warning. These warnings were later discontinued as Earl moved northward through Atlantic Canada; however, a new tropical storm warning was issued for parts of Newfoundland between Burgeo and Boat Harbour. Following the storm's transition into an extratropical cyclone, all warnings were discontinued in Canada.

Earl was predicted to have an 80% chance of striking Nova Scotia (60% chance as a hurricane) since the end of August. This enabled emergency preparations to begin nearly a week before Earl made landfall. On September 2, the Red Cross placed over 900 volunteers on standby. Because anticipated landfall would take place at low neap tide and storm surge would be minimal, no mandatory evacuation orders were issued, although some marinas required boats to be moved to safer mooring. Tourists in the area were warned of the likely impact of the coming storm by the Department of Tourism, Culture and Heritage. Virtually all permanent residents stayed and prepared to be without electricity for a couple of days. While ferries in the area were cancelled, the Confederation Bridge linking New Brunswick and Prince Edward Island was not closed. However, high-sided vehicles and motorcycles were barred from crossing for six hours at the height of the storm.

== Impact ==
=== Caribbean ===
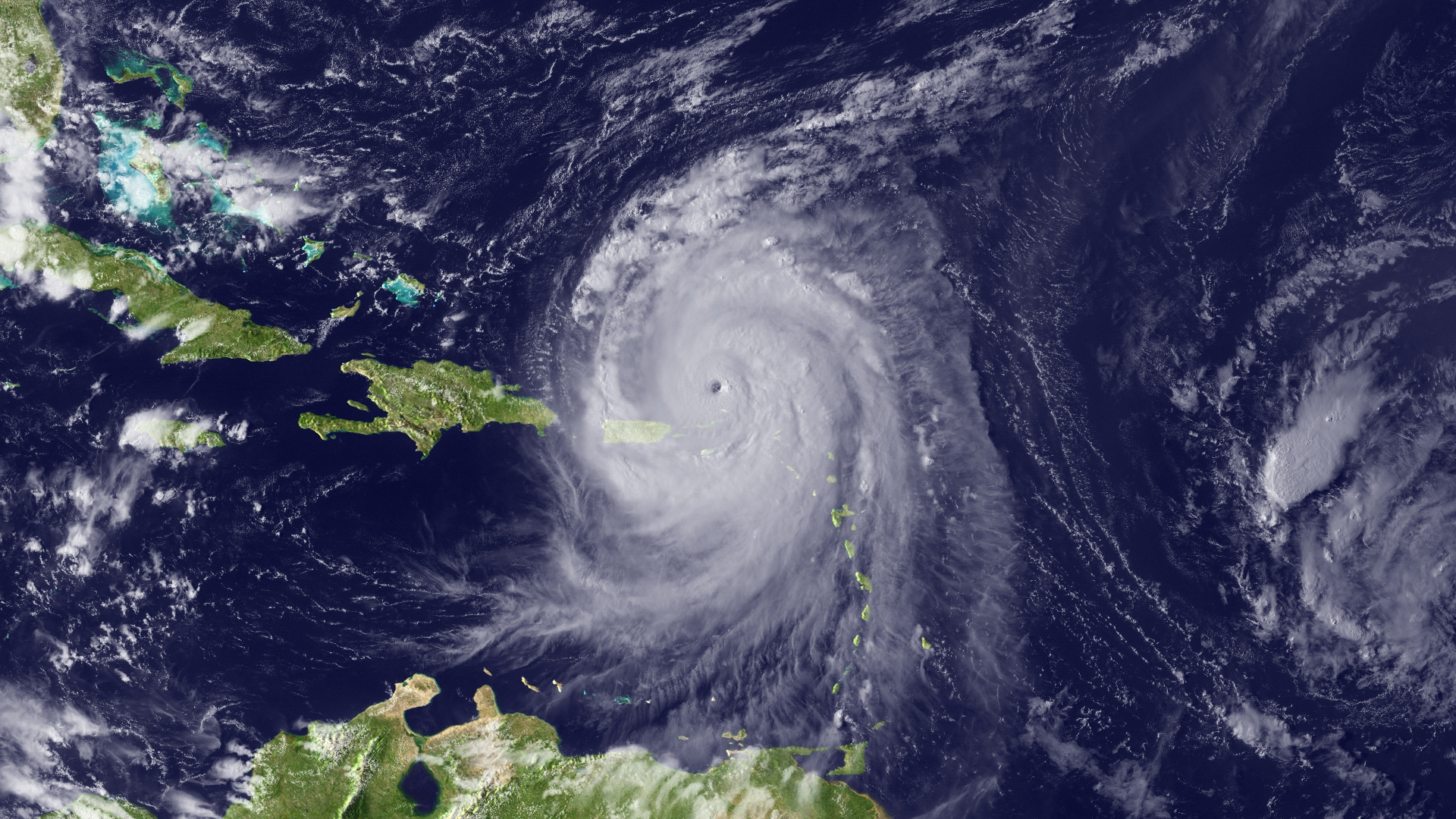
Hurricane Earl moving away from the Leeward Islands on August 30

==== Antigua and Barbuda ====
According to officials in Antigua and Barbuda, the entire island of Antigua was left without power due to Hurricane Earl. High winds felled numerous trees and signs as well as damaged homes. At least one home was destroyed on the island, forcing the evacuation of eight people. An estimated 7 inches (180 mm) of rain fell in the country, resulting in widespread flooding. In Bolans Village, seven people had to be rescued after wading into waist-deep water. Following the passage of Earl, Philmore Mullin, Director of the National Office of Disaster Services, expressed his concern for the lack of action taken by residents prior to the hurricane's arrival. A country-wide holiday was declared for August 30 by Governor General Dame Louise Lake-Tack to help cleanup efforts run more efficiently. Health officials advised residents to also boil their water to avoid water-borne diseases until further notice. One person was killed in relation to the storm after being electrocuted while trying to restore power.

Throughout Antigua and Barbuda, losses from the hurricane amounted to EC$34 million (US$12.6 million). In the wake of Earl, the International Federation of Red Cross and Red Crescent Societies allocated roughly $50,000 (USD) in relief funds for the country. A three-month recovery operation was implemented within days of the storm's passage and focused on providing shelter and sustenance for the 1,000 families displaced by Earl. Additionally, economic assistance due to substantial crop losses was required, especially for families who depend on agriculture.

==== Guadeloupe and the French islands ====
The highest winds recorded during Earl's passage in Guadeloupe was in the island of La Désirade, where sustained gust reached 73 mph (117 km/h), just below hurricane-force wind while in the northern French islands of Saint Barthelemy recorded 90 mph (140 km/h) in Saint Jean and 105 mph (169 km/h) in Gustavia as the minimal pressure fell to 989 mb. In Saint Martin the highest gust reach 83 mph (134 km/h) on the French side as the minimal pressure record at 983.3 mb in Grand Case and the total rainfall was 98,0 mm. Across those islands of Saint Martin, Saint Barthelemy and Guadeloupe, 7,500 people were left without power. In Sint Maarten, the highest gust observed was 88 mph (142 km/h). Damages was moderate : trees and power lines were felled across the island, leaving most residents without power. Some roof damage was sustained by homes on the island as well.

==== Saint Kitts and Nevis ====
High winds and heavy rains, amounting to 3.82 in (97 mm), battered St. Kitts and Nevis; two coast guard vessels were grounded on the islands. Several streets were also flooded throughout the area. Widespread power outages affected many residents on the island, some of whom remained without electricity for 24 hours.

==== British Leeward Islands ====
On Dominica, three minor earthquakes, one measuring 2.7 on the Richter magnitude scale, struck the island during Earl's passage. In Montserrat, moderate damage took place as a result of Earl. Torrential rains, amounting to 12 in (300 mm) triggered several landslides and flooding. No structural damage took place; however, roads, trees and power lines were impacted. Initial assessments from officials indicated that losses reached EC$10 million (US$3.7 million).

In the British territories of Anguilla and the British Virgin Islands, power and water supply was lost to the entire Territory; several vessels on Tortola were grounded. On Anguilla, the highest wind gust reach 88 mph (142 km/h). Three homes were destroyed and 25 others were damaged by the storm. Throughout the British Virgin Islands, losses amounted to $7 million. Hotels throughout the area suffered extensive losses, with three losing $300,000 in damage. In the wake of Earl, the Caribbean Catastrophe Risk Insurance Facility provided Anguilla with $4.3 million for cleanup and repair operations.

Impact from Hurricane Earl
Country	State/Region	Fatalities	Damage (in USD)
Antigua and Barbuda		1	$12.6 million
Canada		1	Unknown
United Kingdom	Anguilla	0	$4.3 million
United Kingdom	Virgin Islands	0	$7.3 million
United Kingdom	Montserrat	0	$3.7 million
Saint Kitts and Nevis		0	Unknown
United States	Florida	3	Minimal
United States	Georgia	0	$8,000
United States	Massachusetts	1	$20,000
United States	North Carolina	0	$3.88 million
United States	New Jersey	2	Minimal
United States	New York	0	Unknown
United States	South Carolina	0	$14,000
United States	Virgin Islands	0	$13.2 million
Total		8	$44.98 million

==== Puerto Rico and the U.S. Virgin Islands ====
Throughout the United States Virgin Islands, high winds, gusting up to 69 mph (111 km/h), and heavy rains, peaking at 3.02 in (77 mm) on St. Thomas, caused significant damage to roadways and power lines. Many residents across the islands were left without power for up to a week as a result of the storm. Following an assessment of the damage, total losses were placed at $2.5 million, allowing the governor of the U.S. V.I. to request for a major disaster declaration from the United States government. This request was later approved by President Barack Obama in late September. In addition to damage to infrastructure, severe losses were sustained in the business sector. As a result of Earl's passage through the region, nearly 22,000 vacationers canceled their plans, resulting in a $10.7 million loss in revenue. In March 2011, the Federal Emergency Management Agency (FEMA) granted $555,219 in public assistance funding to cover the costs from Earl in the Virgin Islands.

Heavy rains also began to affect Puerto Rico during the early afternoon on August 30 as Hurricane Earl moved closer to the island. Throughout the island, a maximum of 5.19 in (132 mm) of rain fell near Naguabo. In San Juan, 3.57 inches (91 mm) of rain fell during the passage of Earl. Dozens of roads were shut down across the island due to flooding and downed power lines. At the height of the storm, roughly 187,000 residences were left without power and 60,000 more were without water. A landslide triggered by heavy rains covered a portion of Puerto Rico Highway 191, temporarily closing the road.

=== United States ===
Hurricane Earl off the Mid-Atlantic.

Throughout the United States, damage from Hurricane Earl was generally minor. Insurance modelers for catastrophes estimated that losses from the storm would not exceed $100 million in the country. According to the federal procurement data system, roughly $300,000 was given by FEMA in relief funds throughout the United States.

==== Southeast ====
Off the coast of Florida, near the Bahamas, one person went missing and is believed to have drowned after encountering 30 m (98 ft) waves produced by Earl. Near Jupiter Inlet, a man fell off his ship during rough seas. Lifeguards found him unconscious and transported him to a nearby hospital where he died on September 7. On September 4, a third person died in Volusia County after being caught in a rip current; more than 200 rescues were made by lifeguards in the county during the day. Persistent swells between 7 and 10 ft (2.1 and 3.0 m) in Tybee Island, Georgia resulted in severe beach erosion. Some places lost up to 20 ft (6.1 m) of beach, leaving $8,000 in losses. On September 4, rip currents produced by Earl resulted in the rescue of 20 to 30 people on the island. In parts of Charleston County, South Carolina, local beaches lost up to 40 ft (12 m) of sand due to Earl. Offshore, a sailors lost control of their boat amidst the rough seas and crashed into a pier, destroying the vessel. Losses in the state reached $14,000.

==== North Carolina ====
Although the center of Hurricane Earl passed roughly 100 mi (160 km) off the coast of North Carolina, its large size brought just under hurricane-force winds and a significant storm surge. Heavy rains accompanied the storm, peaking at 4.52 in (115 mm) in Cape Hatteras. The highest winds were recorded in Cape Hatteras at 67 mph (108 km/h) and gusts reached 83 mph (134 km/h); however, there were few reports of damage in relation to the winds. A storm surge of 4.7 ft (1.4 m) came ashore on Hatteras Island, inundating nearby areas. Minor flooding took place along several roads, including North Carolina Highway 12 which was shut down on Hatteras Island. A pier at Atlantic Beach was also damaged by rough seas. Numerous homes along the coast were flooded by rising waters, reaching 3 ft (0.91 m) in places. An estimated 6,600 residences were left without power due to Hurricane Earl. Waves just offshore were measured between 25 and 36 ft (7.6 and 11.0 m), likely resulting in beach erosion. In Manteo, a gas station lost its canopy and some homes lost roofing shingles due to high winds. Damage in Dare County totaled over $500,000 (2010 USD), with 79 houses in the county sustaining minor damage and another six receiving major damage, mainly due to storm surge. In neighboring Hyde County, strong winds caused about $2 million in crop damage. Several homes were also damaged by fallen trees in the Fairfield and Swan Quarter areas. Throughout the state, damage from Earl amounted to $3.88 million, mainly from losses sustained by national parks and agriculture. Nearly two weeks after Earl's passage, the North Carolina Department of Transportation began to pick up debris left alongside roads in the wake of the storm.

==== Mid-Atlantic ====
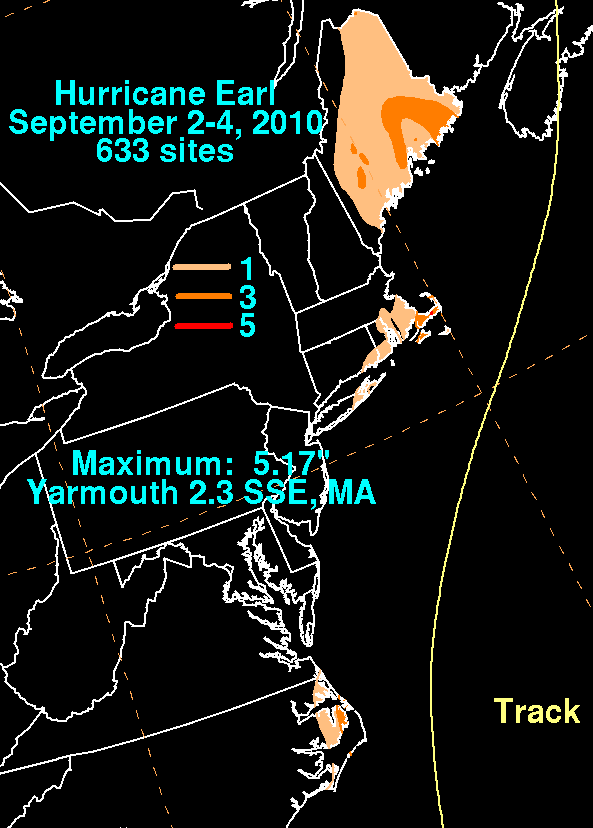
Rainfall from Hurricane Earl along the East Coast of the United States

After brushing North Carolina, Hurricane Earl brought moderate rains and gusty winds to parts of Virginia. Although the center of the storm remained more than 100 mi (160 km) offshore, wind gusts reached 45 mph (72 km/h) in the state. Along the coast, large swells produced by the storm resulted in some beach erosion; however, no damage was reported. Throughout Delaware, the threat of Hurricane Earl lessened Labor Day weekend tourism. Many hotels across the state reached occupancies of 40-60%, significantly lower than initially expected. Along the coast, swells up to 6.02 ft (1.83 m) resulted in minor tidal flooding, though no damage took place. Off the coast of New Jersey two people were killed after being swept out to sea by rip currents. The bodies of both victims were found after they washed onshore days after Earl's passage. The outer bands of Earl brought gusty winds and minimal rainfall, peaking at 0.22 in (5.6 mm) in Chatsworth. Some beach erosion was reported along the coastline, with the worst being in Atlantic City. At the city's Garden Pier, the Historical Museum and the Atlantic City Arts Center was shut down indefinitely after electrical lines and pipes were damaged by waves. After nearly two weeks of beaches being shut down, swimmers were finally allowed to enter the water on September 5 throughout New Jersey.

In Long Island, New York, heavy surf produced by Earl inundated much of Jones Beach State Park, leading to officials closing the area for several days. By September 6, flood waters brought onshore by the storm still remained in the area despite continuous efforts to drain the water. Moderate beach erosion also took place in Robert Moses State Park. Similar impacts were felt in The Hamptons as many roads were temporarily shut down due to flooding. Rainfall from the storm peaked at 2.11 in (54 mm) just outside Jamesport. Following the lack of damage caused by the storm, the Long Island Power Authority was criticized for excessive spending on emergency crews. An estimated $30 million was spent to bring in an additional 1,600 crewmen to deal with possible power outages despite forecasts showing Earl missing the state. Due to the excess funding, residents in New York were faced with increased rates for power. Additionally, New York senator Charles Fuschillo called for an audit of the power authority. It was later determined that LIPA had "jumped the gun" on the situation and brought in the assistance without necessity. In their defense, the agency claimed that "it [was] better to be safe than sorry", referring to the power outage following Hurricane Gloria in 1985 which affected parts of Long Island for over a week.

==== New England ====
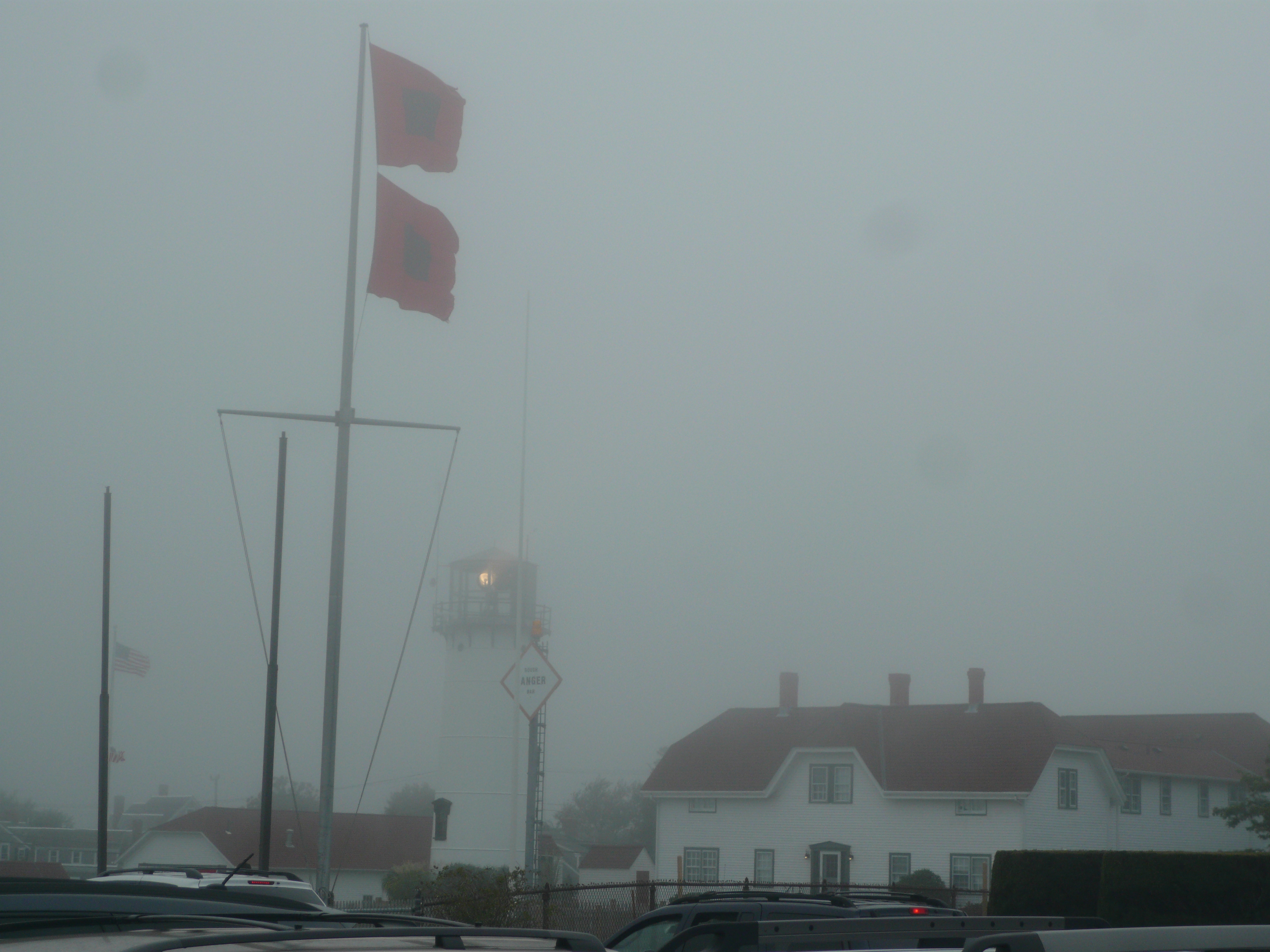
Chatham, Massachusetts Lighthouse during Earl on September 3

On August 31, several days prior to Earl's passage, rough seas produced by the storm killed a man in Massachusetts after he was knocked off rocks and pulled out to sea. Late on September 3, a weakened Tropical Storm Earl brushed New England, with its center passing roughly 90 mi (140 km) south-southeast of Nantucket, Massachusetts. During the height of the storm, heavy rains and winds up to 58 mph (93 km/h) buffeted the coastline. In Yarmouth, a total of 5.17 in (131 mm) of rain fell during the storm, the highest in the state. Throughout the state, roughly 1,800 residences, roughly 600 of which were on Cape Cod, lost power due to downed trees and power lines. In the local harbors, most boats were unaffected by the storm; however, one did capsize. The most significant losses were to businesses who lost their Labor Day weekend revenue. Several hotels estimated that 10% of the revenue was lost, this equates to hundreds of thousands of dollars. One hotel in Yarmouth reported an 80% decrease in attendance despite a price cut from $130 to $85. On the other hand, supply stores saw improved sales, experiencing a 20% increase in revenues. Due to the lack of major damage from the storm, most businesses reopened on September 4 and tourists resumed their weekend plans. Throughout the state, Earl left $20,000 in damage.

In parts of Rhode Island, coastal flooding inundated low-lying roads, leaving ocean debris behind. Further north in Maine, the effects of Earl were limited to increased swells along the coast and moderate rainfall. Several areas across the state measured over 2 in (51 mm) of rain, with the highest total being measured at 4.28 in (109 mm) in Machias. Winds in the state peaked between 35 and 40 mph (56 and 64 km/h), though no wind damage took place. Prior to Earl's arrival, a dry spell left several brooks and streams nearly empty; however, the rainfall from the storm alleviated the drought conditions. Only one road experienced flooding as a result of the rains. According to state transportation officials, northbound and southbound traffic along the Maine Turnpike was down 19% and 2.7% respectively, indicating that many tourists who were expected to travel to the region changed their plans.

=== Canada ===
Hurricane Earl shortly after making landfall in Nova Scotia on September 4

Hurricane Earl came ashore in Queens County near Western Head, Nova Scotia on September 4 around 10:00 am (1400 UTC), as a category 1 storm with sustained winds of 75 mph (121 km/h). Just offshore, buoys recorded winds near hurricane-force and enormous waves up to 82 ft (25 m) tall. Onshore, strong winds and heavy rain affected much of Atlantic Canada; rainfall peaked at 3 inches (76 mm) in Edmundston, New Brunswick. In Quebec, heavy rains from the storm amounted to at least 1.9 inches (48 mm); however, reports from a storm chaser indicate that up to 3.2 inches (81 mm) may have fallen in Passes-Dangereuses. The strongest winds onshore reached 84 mph (135 km/h) on Beaver Island. Sustained winds of at least 39 mph (63 km/h) likely affected all of Nova Scotia, Prince Edward Island, much of Newfoundland, and parts of eastern New Brunswick, as well as extreme eastern Quebec and Labrador.

Throughout the affected region, about 252,000 residences, nearly one million people, were left without power as a result of Earl. Roughly 104,000 residences that lost power were in the Halifax metro area. The city received some of the worst impacts from the storm, experiencing near-hurricane-force winds around 12:00 pm (local time) on September 4. Several structures in the city were struck by fallen trees. At the height of the storm, Nova Scotia Routes 207, 331 and 333 were shut down due to flooding and downed power lines. Numerous trees and power lines were downed throughout Nova Scotia, blocking roads and damaging homes. Earl's only fatality in Canada occurred when one man drowned while trying to retrieve a boat which had been dislodged from its moorings.

Throughout Prince Edward Island, high winds left roughly 9,000 homes and businesses without power. Minor streets flooding and downed trees impeded travel throughout the area. In New Brunswick, little damage took place during Earl's passage; some trees were downed, resulting in scattered power outages. Along the St. George's Bay area in Newfoundland, numerous residents were left without power due to fallen trees and power lines. No injuries or major damage took place on the island and power was expected to be fully restored by the afternoon of September 5. Intense winds produced by the storm felled numerous trees, some more than 100 years old, and damaged homes.

Within hours of the storm's passage in Nova Scotia, hundreds of power crews were deployed to restore electricity as quickly as possible. Once winds dropped below 65 mph (105 km/h), roughly 400 crewmen began fixing damaged lines. One lineman was injured after briefly coming into contact with live wires. Additional crews from New Brunswick, consisting of 18 trucks and 36 linemen, were deployed to the hardest hit regions. Roughly 90,000 Nova Scotia residences had their electricity restored by 10:00 pm the same night. By the morning of September 5, about 92,000 residences remained without power across Nova Scotia. It was not until September 7 that all residents affected by the storm had their power restored.

== See also ==
- Other storms of the same name
- Timeline of the 2010 Atlantic hurricane season
- Hurricane Helene (1958)
- Hurricane Luis (1995)
- Hurricane Bill (2009)
- Hurricane Fiona (2022)
- Hurricane Lee (2023)
- List of Category 4 Atlantic hurricanes
- List of North Carolina hurricanes (2000–present)
- List of New England hurricanes
- List of Canada hurricanes
