= Huauchinango (municipality) =

Coordinates: 20.1767°N 98.0528°W

Huauchinango Municipality
- Municipality
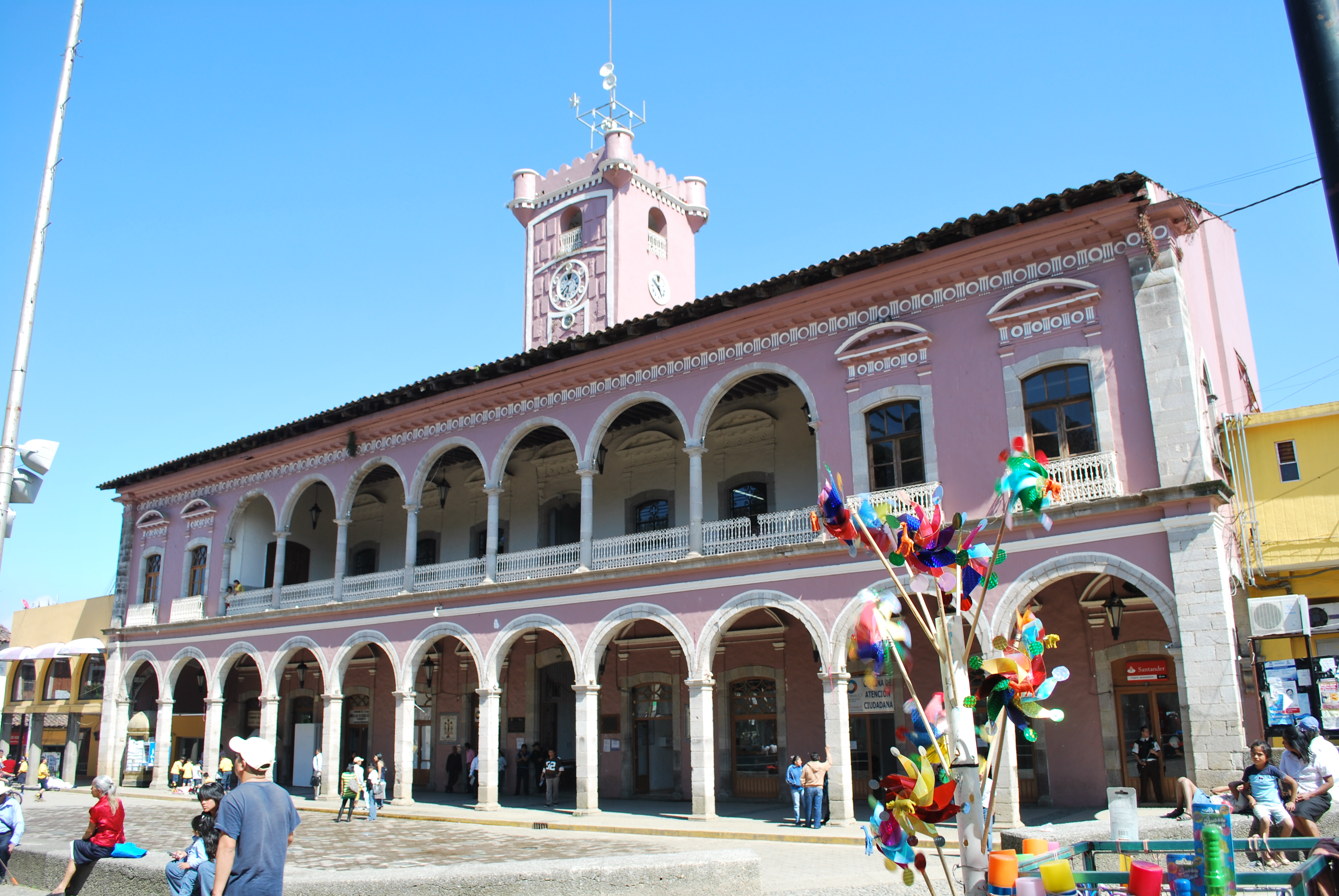

- Coat of arms

- Location of the municipality in Puebla
- Country: Mexico
- State: Puebla

Population (2020)
  - Total: 103,946
- Time zone: UTC-6 (Central Standard Time)

Huauchinango is a municipality in the Mexican state of Puebla. The municipal seat is at Huauchinango.
