= Lismore, Nova Scotia =

Community in Nova Scotia, Canada

Coordinates: 45°42′13.18″N 62°15′48.49″W

Lismore in Nova Scotia

Lismore is a community in the Canadian province of Nova Scotia, located in Pictou County.

The name Lismore comes from Irish Lios Mór or Scottish Gaelic Lios Mòr, both meaning "great ringfort" or "great garden".

It's known mainly for its lobster. It's considered the best tasting lobster caught and sold in the markets. The area has some unique habitats for the lobster to survive in which is why many people believe the meat tastes better.

The largest Lobster fishing vessel in Pictou County (possibly Nova Scotia) is docked in the harbor.
