= Timeline of the 2009 North Indian Ocean cyclone season =

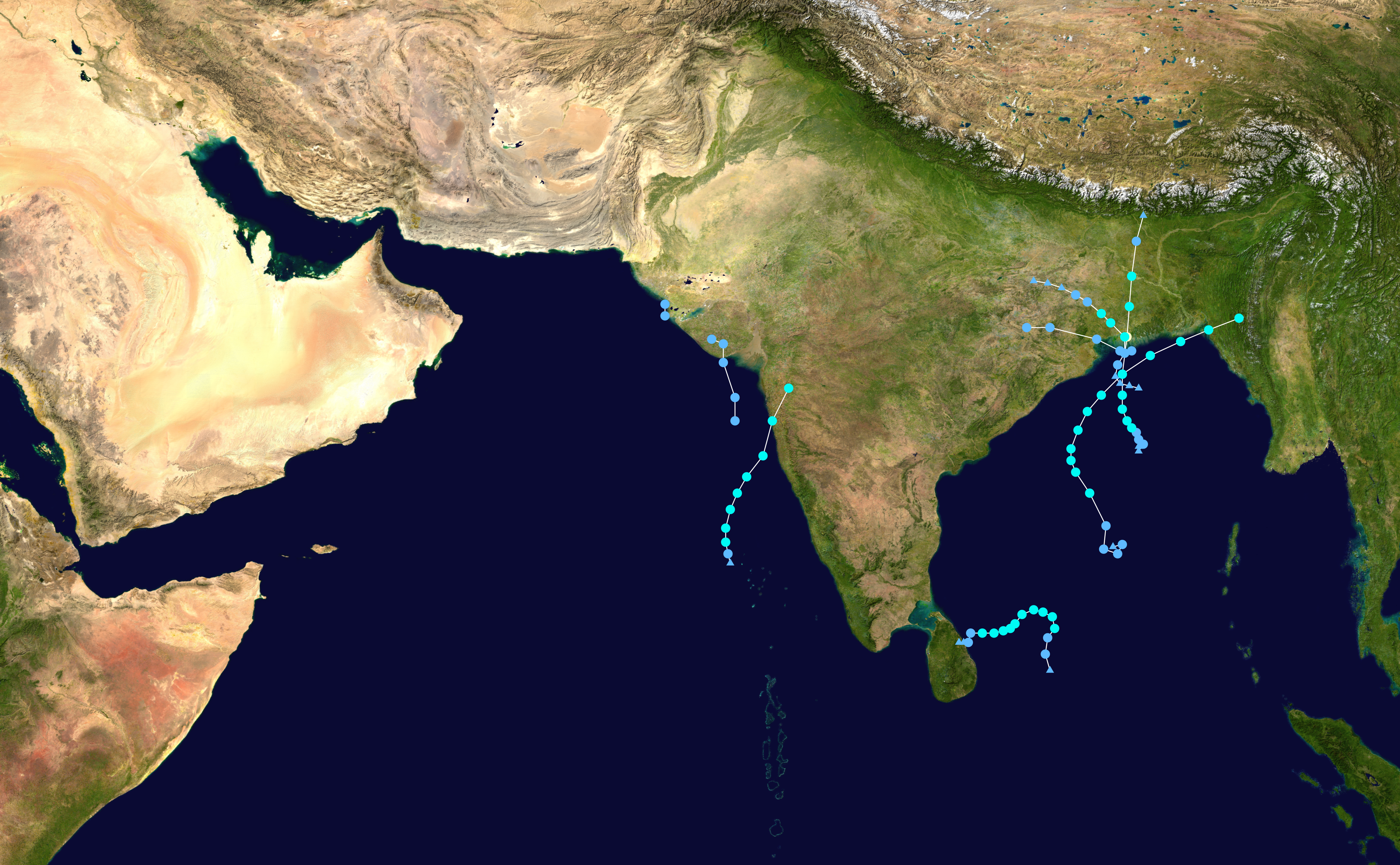
- Season summary map

Season boundaries
- First system formed: April 14, 2009
- Last system dissipated: December 16, 2009

Strongest system
- Name: Aila
- Maximum winds: 110 km/h (70 mph) (3-minute sustained)
- Lowest pressure: 968 hPa (mbar)

Longest lasting system
- Name: Ward
- Duration: 6 days
Storm articles
- Cyclone Bijli
- Cyclone Aila
- Cyclone Phyan

This is a timeline of the 2009 North Indian Ocean cyclone season, which contains details of when a depression forms, strengthens, weakens, makes landfalls, and dissipates during the 2009 North Indian Ocean cyclone season. It also includes information from post-storm analysis by the Joint Typhoon Warning Center (JTWC), and the India Meteorological Department (IMD) who run the Regional Specialized Meteorological Center in New Delhi, India. RSMC New Delhi's area of responsibility is officially between 45°E and 100E which is east of the Horn of Africa and west of the Malay Peninsula. There are two main seas within the North Indian Ocean, the Arabian Sea and the Bay of Bengal. For storms, these are abbreviated as BOB and ARB by the IMD.

So far this season there have been four depressions that have formed; three in the Bay of Bengal and one in the Arabian Sea. Three of the depressions have intensified further with two becoming cyclonic storms with the names Bijli and Aila being assigned to them, whilst the other depression became a Deep Depression. Aila intensified further and peaked as a Severe Cyclonic Storm.

== Timeline of events ==
=== January ===
January 1

- The North Indian Ocean cyclone season officially begins.

=== April ===
April 14

- 0900 UTC (1430 IST) – The IMD reports that Depression BOB01, has formed over the southeast Bay of Bengal.

April 15
0600 UTC (1130 IST) – The IMD reports that Depression BOB01 has intensified into a deep depression.
1200 UTC (1730 IST) – The IMD reports that Deep Depression BOB01 has intensified into a Cyclonic Storm and names it as Bijli.

April 17
0900 UTC (1430 IST) – The IMD reports that Cyclonic Storm Bijli has weakened into a deep depression.
1200 UTC (1730 IST) – The IMD reports that Deep Depression Bijli has weakened into a depression.
1800 UTC (2330 IST) – The IMD reports that Depression Bijli, has made landfall near Chittagong, Bangladesh.
1800 UTC (2330 IST) – The IMD reports that Depression Bijli, has weakened into a well marked low-pressure area and issues its final advisory.

=== May ===
May 23
0600 UTC (1130 IST) – The IMD reports that Depression BOB02, has formed over the western Bay of Bengal.

May 24
0300 UTC (0830 IST) – The IMD reports that Depression BOB02 to a deep depression.
1200 UTC (1730 IST) – The IMD reports that Deep Depression BOB02 to a Cyclonic Storm and names it as Aila.

May 25
0600 UTC (1130 IST) – The IMD reports that Cyclonic Storm Aila has intensified to a Severe Cyclonic Storm.
0900 UTC (1430 IST) – The IMD reports that Severe Cyclonic Storm Aila has made landfall near Sagar Island, in India.
1500 UTC (2030 IST) – The IMD reports that Severe Cyclonic Storm Aila has weakened into a cyclonic storm.

May 26
0300 UTC (0830 IST) – The IMD reports that Cyclonic Storm Aila has weakened into a deep depression.
0600 UTC (1130 IST) – The IMD reports that Deep Depression Aila has weakened into a depression.
0900 UTC (1430 IST) – The IMD reports that Depression Aila has weakened into a well marked low-pressure area.

=== June ===
June 23
0000 UTC (0530 IST) – The IMD reports that Depression ARB01 has formed over the central Arabian Sea to the west of Mumbai, India.
1500 UTC (2030 IST) – The IMD reports that Depression ARB01 has made its first landfall on the south Gujarat coast.

June 24
0300 UTC (0830 IST) – The IMD reports that Depression ARB01 to a well marked low-pressure area and issues its final advisory.

June 25
0900 UTC (1430 IST) – The IMD reports that Depression ARB01 has emerged into the northeast Arabian Sea and regenerated.

June 26
0000 UTC (0530 IST) – The IMD reports that Depression ARB01-2009 has weakened into an area of low pressure.

=== July ===
July 20
0300 UTC (0830 IST) – The IMD reports that Depression BOB03 has formed in the northwest Bay of Bengal.
1200 UTC (1730 IST) – The IMD reports that Depression BOB03 has intensified into a deep depression.
c1600–1700 UTC (2130–2230 IST) – Deep Depression BOB03 makes landfall between Balasore and Digha.

July 21
0600 UTC (1030 IST) – The IMD reports that Deep Depression BOB03 has weakened into a Depression.
1100 UTC (1430 IST) – The IMD reports that Depression BOB03 has weakened into a low-pressure area, and issues their final advisory.

=== November ===
November 9
0900 UTC (1430 IST) – The IMD designates a low-pressure area west of Amini Divi, India as Depression ARB03-2009.

November 10
0300 UTC (0830 IST) – The IMD upgrades Depression ARB03-2009 to a deep depression.
1800 UTC (2330 IST) – The IMD upgrades Deep Depression ARB03 to a Cyclonic Storm and names it as Phyan.

November 11
c1030 UTC (1600 IST) – Cyclonic Storm Phyan makes landfall in Maharashtra between Alibagh and Mumbai
1200 UTC (1730 IST) – The IMD downgrades Cyclonic Storm Phyan to a deep depression.
1800 UTC (2330 IST) – The IMD downgrades Deep Depression, Former Phyan to a depression.

November 12
0000 UTC (0530 IST) – The IMD downgrades Depression, Former Phyan to a well marked low-pressure area and issues its final bulletin on the system.

=== December ===
December 10

- 0900 UTC (1430 IST) – IMD indicates that Depression BOB05-2009 has formed over southwest and adjoining southeast Bay of Bengal.

December 11

- 0000 UTC (0530 IST) – The IMD upgrades Depression BOB05-2009 to a deep depression.
- 0900 UTC (1430 IST) – The IMD upgrades Deep Depression BOB05 to a cyclonic storm and names it Ward.

December 12

- 1800 UTC (2330 IST) – The IMD downgrades Cyclonic Storm Ward to a deep depression.

December 14

- c0800-0900 UTC (1330–1430 IST) – Deep Depression, Former Ward makes landfall over Sri Lanka coast near Trincomalee.
- 0900 UTC (1430 IST) – IMD downgrades Deep Depression, Former Ward to a depression.

December 16

- Depression, Former Ward dissipates completely

== See also ==
- 2009 North Indian Ocean cyclone season
- North Indian Ocean tropical cyclone
- Timeline of the 2009 Atlantic hurricane season
- Timeline of the 2009 Pacific hurricane season
- Timeline of the 2009 Pacific typhoon season
- Timeline of the 2008–09 South-West Indian Ocean cyclone season
- Timeline of the 2008–09 South Pacific cyclone season
- Timeline of the 2008–09 Australian region cyclone season
