= 2009 Northern Hemisphere tropical cyclone season =

The 2009 Northern Hemisphere tropical cyclone season may refer to:

- 2009 Atlantic hurricane season
- 2009 Pacific hurricane season
- 2009 Pacific typhoon season
- 2009 North Indian Ocean cyclone season
