= Australian cricket team in India in 2009–10 =

Australian cricket team in India 2009–10
	India	Australia
- Dates: 25 October – 11 November 2009
Captains	Mahendra Singh Dhoni	Ricky Ponting

One Day International series
- Results: Australia won the 7-match series 4–2
Most runs	Mahendra Singh Dhoni (285)	Michael Hussey (313)
Most wickets	Harbhajan Singh (8)	Shane Watson (10)
- Player of the series: Shane Watson (Aus)

The Australia Cricket Team toured India from 25 October to 11 November 2009. The tour consisted of seven One Day International matches and the series was won by Australia with a final tally of 4-2 (one match was abandoned due to rain).

== Squads ==
India	Australia
MS Dhoni (c) (wk)	Ricky Ponting (c)
Virendar Sehwag (vc)	Michael Hussey (vc)
Gautam Gambhir	Doug Bollinger
Sachin Tendulkar	Nathan Hauritz
Yuvraj Singh	Ben Hilfenhaus
Suresh Raina	Jon Holland
Ravindra Jadeja	James Hopes ^{1}
Praveen Kumar	Mitchell Johnson
Harbhajan Singh	Brett Lee ^{2}
Ishant Sharma	Shaun Marsh
Ashish Nehra	Tim Paine (wk) ^{3}
Virat Kohli	Peter Siddle^{4}
Munaf Patel	Adam Voges
Sudeep Tyagi	Shane Watson
Amit Mishra	Cameron White
Dinesh Karthik (wk)	

1. James Hopes flew home after suffering a hamstring injury in the first ODI. Victorian Bowler Clint McKay took Hopes' place in the squad.
2. Brett Lee flew home after suffering an elbow injury in the first ODI. New South Wales all-rounder Moises Henriques^{5} took Lee's place in the squad.
3. Wicket-keeper Tim Paine flew home after seriously breaking his finger in the second ODI. South Australian wicket-keeper Graham Manou took Paine's place in the squad.
4. Peter Siddle flew home after suffering soreness in the left side of his body in the fourth ODI. New South Wales bowler Burt Cockley took Siddle's place in the squad.
5. Moises Henriques flew home after suffering a damaged hamstring in the fourth ODI. Victorian all-rounder Andrew McDonald took Henriques' place in the squad.

== ODI series ==
=== 1st ODI ===
25 October
09:00 IST
Scorecard

Australia; 292/8 (50 overs)	v	India; 288/8 (50 overs)
Ricky Ponting 74 (85); Ishant Sharma 3/50 (10 overs)		Gautam Gambhir 68 (85); Mitchell Johnson 2/59 (10 overs)

Australia won by 4 runs
Reliance Stadium, Vadodara
Umpires: Mark Benson (Eng) and Shavir Tarapore (Ind)
Player of the match: Michael Hussey (Aus)

- Australia won the toss and elected to bat.
- Praveen Kumar and Harbhajan Singh's partnership of 84 runs for the eighth wicket was the highest for India, before it was surpassed by MS Dhoni and Bhuvneshwar Kumar's stand of 100 in 2017.

=== 2nd ODI ===
28 October
14:30 IST (D/N)
Scorecard

India; 354/7 (50 overs)	v	Australia; 255 (48.3 overs)
Mahendra Singh Dhoni 124 (107); Mitchell Johnson 3/75 (10 overs)		Michael Hussey 53 (60); Ravindra Jadeja 3/35 (6.3 overs)

India won by 99 runs
Vidarbha Cricket Association Stadium, Nagpur
Umpires: Amish Saheba (Ind) and Shavir Tarapore (Ind)
Player of the match: MS Dhoni (Ind)

- Australia won the toss and elected to field.
- This was the First ODI at this venue

=== 3rd ODI ===
31 October
14:30 IST (D/N)
Scorecard

Australia; 229/5 (50 overs)	v	India; 230/4 (48.2 overs)
Michael Hussey 81* (82); Ravindra Jadeja 2/41 (9 overs)		Yuvraj Singh 78 (96); Mitchell Johnson 1/43 (9.2 overs)

India won by 6 wickets
Feroz Shah Kotla, Delhi
Umpires: Amiesh Saheba (Ind) and Shavir Tarapore (Ind)
Player of the match: Yuvraj Singh (Ind)

- Australia won the toss and elected to bat.
- Moisés Henriques and Graham Manou (Aus) made their ODI debuts.

=== 4th ODI ===
2 November
14:30 IST (D/N)
Scorecard

Australia; 250 (49.2 overs)	v	India; 226 (46.4 overs)
Cameron White 62 (71); Ashish Nehra 3/37 (8 overs)		Sachin Tendulkar 40 (68); Shane Watson 3/29 (7.4 overs)

Australia won by 24 runs
PCA Stadium, Mohali
Umpires: Asoka de Silva (SL) and Amiesh Saheba (Ind)
Player of the match: Shane Watson (Aus)

- India won the toss and elected to field.

=== 5th ODI ===
5 November
14:30 IST (D/N)
Scorecard

Australia; 350/4 (50 overs)	v	India; 347 (49.4 overs)
Shaun Marsh 112 (112); Praveen Kumar 2/68 (9 overs)		Sachin Tendulkar 175 (141); Shane Watson 3/47 (8.4 overs)

Australia won by 3 runs
Rajiv Gandhi International Stadium, Hyderabad
Umpires: Asoka de Silva (SL) and Shavir Tarapore (Ind)
Player of the match: Sachin Tendulkar (Ind)

- Australia won the toss and elected to bat.
- Clint McKay (Aus) made his ODI debut.
- Sachin Tendulkar (Ind) became the first batsman to reach 17,000 runs in ODIs.
- Sachin Tendulkar equalled the record for the highest individual score against Australia in ODIs (175), before it was surpassed by Rohit Sharma in 2013.

=== 6th ODI ===
8 November
08:30 IST
Scorecard

India; 170 (47 overs)	v	Australia; 172/4 (41.5 overs)
Ravindra Jadeja 57 (103); Doug Bollinger 5/35 (10 overs)		Shane Watson 49 (49); Harbhajan Singh 2/23 (10 overs)

Australia won by 6 wickets
Nehru Stadium, Guwahati
Umpires: Asoka de Silva (SL) and Shavir Tarapore (Ind)
Player of the match: Doug Bollinger (Aus)

- India won the toss and elected to bat.

=== 7th ODI ===
11 November
14:30 IST (D/N)
Scorecard

India	v	Australia

Match abandoned due to Cyclone Phyan
DY Patil Stadium, Navi Mumbai
Umpires: Asoka de Silva (SL) and Amiesh Saheba (Ind)

- No toss made.

== Media coverage ==
Television

- Sky Sports (live) – United Kingdom
- Fox Sports (live) – Australia
- NEO Cricket (live) – India and Middle East
- Star TV (live) – Singapore and Malaysia
- Supersport (live) – South Africa, Kenya and Zimbabwe
- Zee Sports (live) – USA
- CBS (live) – Barbados, Jamaica and Trinidad
- DD National(live) – India
- Geo Super – (live) Pakistan
