= Cyclone Phyan =

North Indian Ocean cyclone in 2009

Cyclonic Storm Phyan (04A)
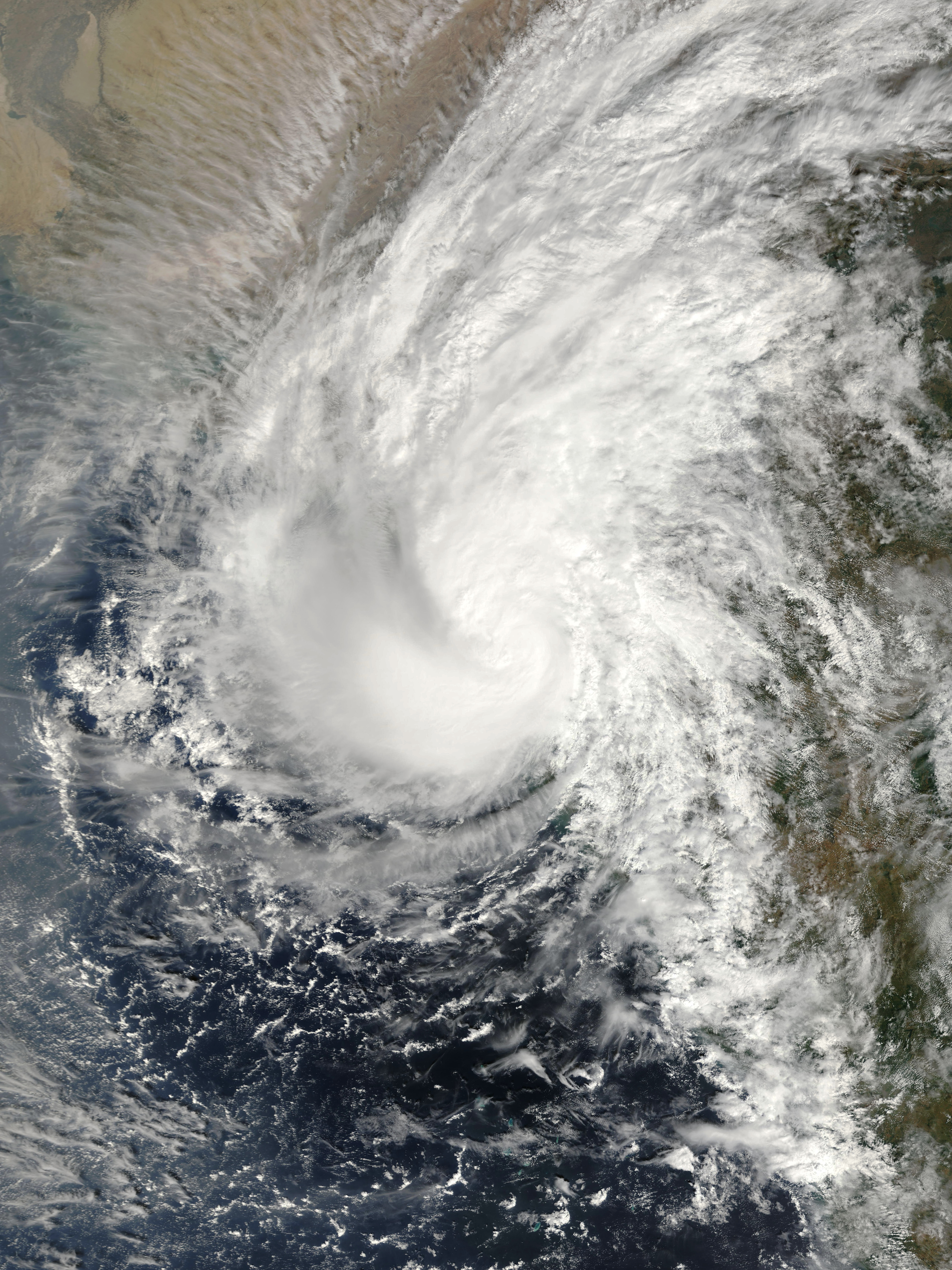
- Phyan shortly after landfall on 11 November 2009

Meteorological history
- Formed: 9 November 2009
- Dissipated: 11 November 2009

Cyclonic storm
- 3-minute sustained (IMD)
- Highest winds: 85 km/h (50 mph)
- Lowest pressure: 988 hPa (mbar); 29.18 inHg

Tropical storm
- 1-minute sustained (SSHWS/JTWC)
- Highest winds: 95 km/h (60 mph)

Overall effects
- Fatalities: 20 direct
- Damage: $300 million (2009 USD)
- Areas affected: Sri Lanka, India, Pakistan
- IBTrACS
- Part of the 2009 North Indian Ocean cyclone season

Cyclonic Storm Phyan (Note: The name Phyan (Burmese: ဖျံ, [pʰjàɴ]) was contributed by Myanmar and refers to the smooth-coated otter (Lutrogale perspicillata) in Burmese.) developed as a tropical disturbance to the southwest of Colombo in Sri Lanka on 4 November 2009. Over the next couple of days, the disturbance gradually developed before weakening as it made landfall on Southern India on 7 November. After the disturbance emerged into the Arabian Sea, it rapidly became more of a concern to the India Meteorological Department (IMD) reporting early on 9 November that the disturbance had intensified into a Depression, and designated it as Depression ARB 03 whilst the Joint Typhoon Warning Center (JTWC) issued a Tropical Cyclone Formation Alert. Later that day, the JTWC designated the system as Cyclone 04A. During the next day, the Depression turned towards the northeast the IMD reported that it had intensified into a Cyclonic Storm and named it as Phyan.

== Meteorological history ==
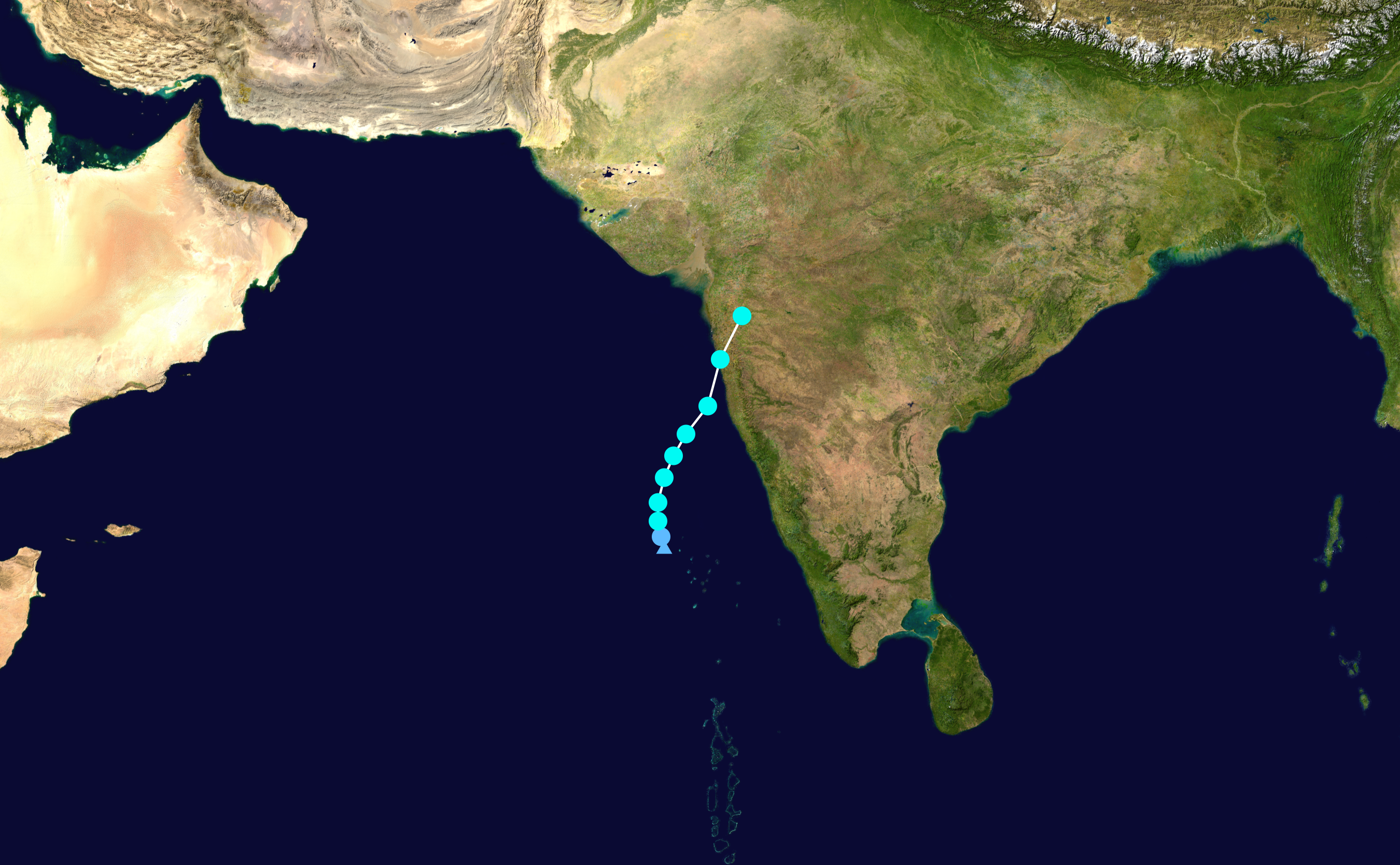
Map plotting the storm's track and intensity, according to the Saffir–Simpson scale Map key Saffir–Simpson scale Tropical depression (≤38 mph, ≤62 km/h) Tropical storm (39–73 mph, 63–118 km/h) Category 1 (74–95 mph, 119–153 km/h) Category 2 (96–110 mph, 154–177 km/h) Category 3 (111–129 mph, 178–208 km/h) Category 4 (130–156 mph, 209–251 km/h) Category 5 (≥157 mph, ≥252 km/h) Unknown Storm type Tropical cyclone Subtropical cyclone Extratropical cyclone, remnant low, tropical disturbance, or monsoon depression

Late on 4 November 2009, the Joint Typhoon Warning Center (JTWC) reported that an area of convection had started to deepen around a poorly organized and elongated low level circulation center about 340 km (210 mi), to the southwest of Colombo in Sri Lanka. The low level circulation center was located in a region of upper level divergence which was providing a good channel for outflow, however it was also located in an area of moderate to high levels of vertical wind shear. During the next couple of days the disturbance gradually developed whilst moving around a subtropical ridge of pressure before the disturbance moved onshore in India during 7 November and became more marked as it moved out into the warm waters of the Arabian Sea during the next day. Early on 9 November, as a Tropical Cyclone Formation Alert was issued by the JTWC; the India Meteorological Department (IMD) reported that the disturbance had become a depression and designated it as Depression ARB 03 as multiple bands of deep convection had started to consolidate around the now well-defined low-level circulation center.

Later on 9 November, the JTWC reported that the depression had intensified into a tropical cyclone, designating it as 04A, with wind speeds equivalent to a tropical storm as organized deep convection increased around a consolidating low level circulation center. Early the next day the IMD reported that the depression had intensified into a Deep Depression as convection organized further. The IMD further reported later that day that the deep depression had reached its peak windspeeds of 65 km/h (40 mph) 3-min sustained, which made it a Cyclonic storm with it being named as Phyan whilst located about 500 km (310miles) to the southwest of Mumbai as it moved into an area of high vertical wind shear. Early on 11 November the JTWC reported that Phyan had reached its peak intensity of 95 km/h (60 mph), before the Cyclone made landfall in Maharashtra between Alibagh and Mumbai later that morning. Later that day as the low level circulation center had rapidly detached from the deep convection the JTWC issued their final advisory whilst the IMD reported that Phyan had weakened into a depression before downgrading it to a well marked area of low pressure early on 12 November.

== Preparations and impact ==
Wettest tropical cyclones and their remnants in India Highest-known totals
| Precipitation | | | Storm | Location | Ref. |
| Rank | mm | in | Storm | Location | Ref. |
|---|---|---|---|---|---|
| 1 | 2,300 | 90.55 | 1968 Severe Cyclonic Storm | Pedong, West Bengal | |
| 2 | 1,840 | 72.44 | Severe Cyclonic Storm ARB 01 (2004) | Aminidivi, Lakshadweep | |
| 3 | 1,340 | 52.76 | Depression Six (1961) | Cherrapunji, Meghalaya | |
| 4 | 1280 | 50.39 | Nisha (2008) | Orathanadu, Tamil Nadu | |
| 5 | 1171 | 46.10 | Phyan (2009) | Kethi, Tamil Nadu | |
| 6 | 1030 | 40.55 | Ogni (2006) | Avanigadda, Andhra Pradesh | |
| 7 | 953 | 37.52 | 1943 Severe Cyclonic Storm | Cuddalore, Tamil Nadu | |
| 8 | 910 | 35.83 | Deep Depression Four (1963) | Cherrapunji, Meghalaya | |
| 9 | 810 | 31.89 | Cyclone 12 (1959) | Bano | |
| 10 | 800 | 31.50 | Cyclone 5 (1968) | Harnai | |

As the IMD upgraded the depression to Cyclonic Storm Phyan, they warned the states of Gujarat and Maharashtra to expect extremely heavy rainfall of over 25 cm, (9.84 inches), over South Gujarat and North Maharashtra whilst squally winds of 70–75 km/h were expected along and off the coasts of Karnataka, Goa and Maharashtra. Fishermen were advised not to venture into the sea along and off these coasts as the sea condition would be very rough.

Massive damage to property was reported in the districts of Ratnagiri, Raigad, Sindhudurg, Thane and Palghar. In Navi Mumbai the 7th one-day international cricket match between India and Australia was abandoned after Cyclone Phyan brought heavy rain to Mumbai.

As a tropical disturbance, Phyan caused heavy rainfall in Tamil Nadu. Kethi in Nilgiris district of Tamil Nadu recorded 82 cm of rainfall in 24 hours, beating the previous 24‑hour rainfall record for Tamil Nadu. Kethi recorded 1171 mm of rainfall in 72 hours, making it the 5th wettest cyclone in India.

== See also ==
- 2009 North Indian Ocean cyclone season
- Timeline of the 2009 North Indian Ocean cyclone season
- Cyclone Nisarga
