= Cyclone Maarutha =

North Indian Ocean cyclone in 2017

Cyclonic Storm Maarutha
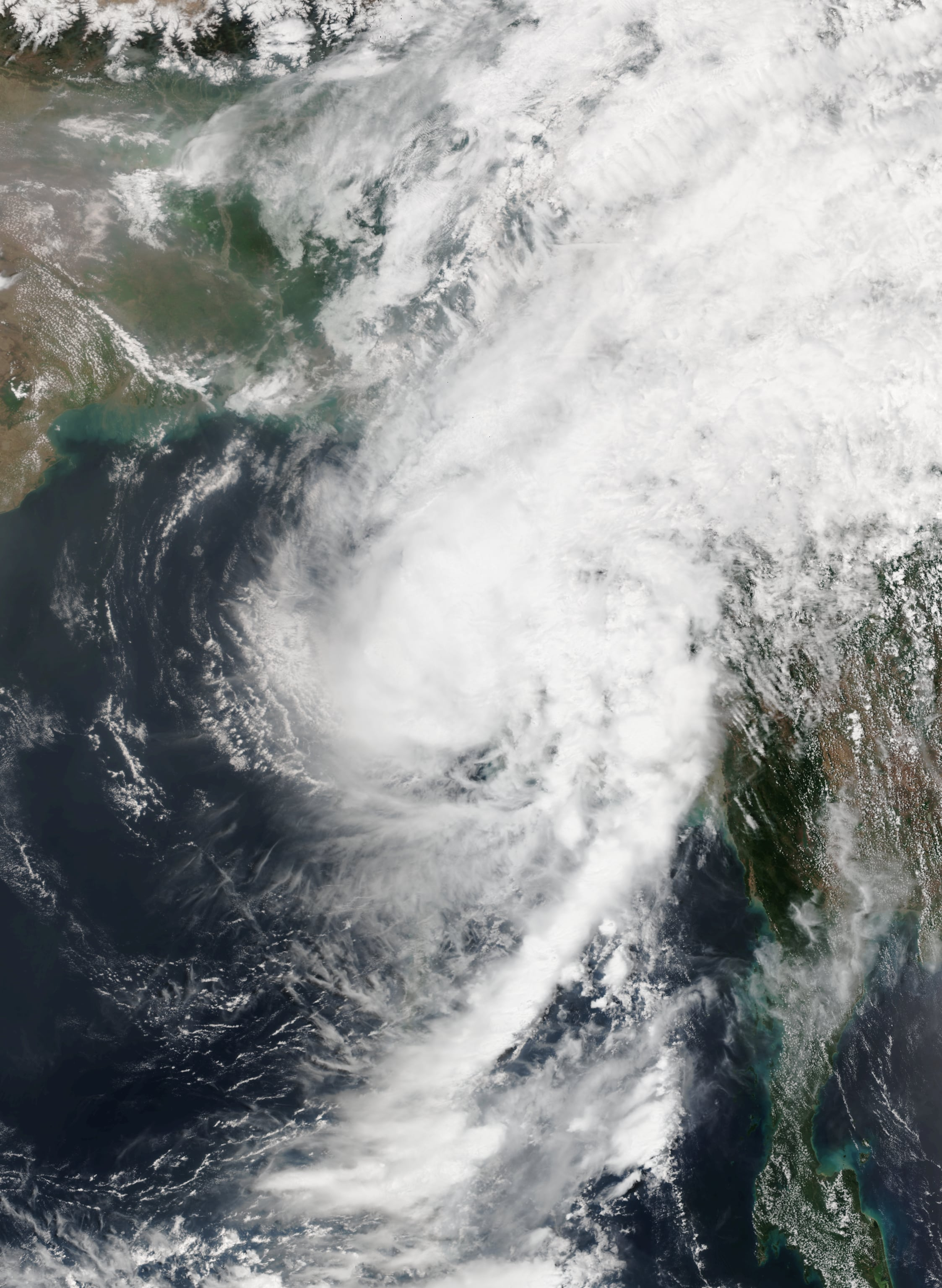
- Cyclone Maarutha at peak intensity on April 16

Meteorological history
- Formed: April 15, 2017
- Dissipated: April 17, 2017

Cyclonic storm
- 3-minute sustained (IMD)
- Highest winds: 75 km/h (45 mph)
- Lowest pressure: 996 hPa (mbar); 29.41 inHg

Tropical storm
- 1-minute sustained (SSHWS/JTWC)
- Highest winds: 95 km/h (60 mph)
- Lowest pressure: 985 hPa (mbar); 29.09 inHg

Overall effects
- Fatalities: 4
- Damage: $23,400 (2017 USD)
- Areas affected: Andaman and Nicobar Islands, Yunnan, Myanmar, Sri Lanka
- IBTrACS
- Part of the 2017 North Indian Ocean cyclone season

Cyclonic Storm Maarutha (Note: The name Maarutha (Sinhala: මාරුත, [maːruta]) was contributed by Sri Lanka and means "wind, gale, air" in Sinhala.) was the first tropical cyclone to make landfall in Myanmar in April. The first tropical cyclone and named storm of the 2017 North Indian Ocean cyclone season, Maarutha was a relatively short-lived and weak system, nonetheless causing notable damage in Myanmar. Maarutha formed from an area of low pressure over the southern Bay of Bengal on April 15. The next morning, RSMC New Delhi upgraded the low-pressure area to a Depression and designated it as BOB 01.

== Meteorological History ==
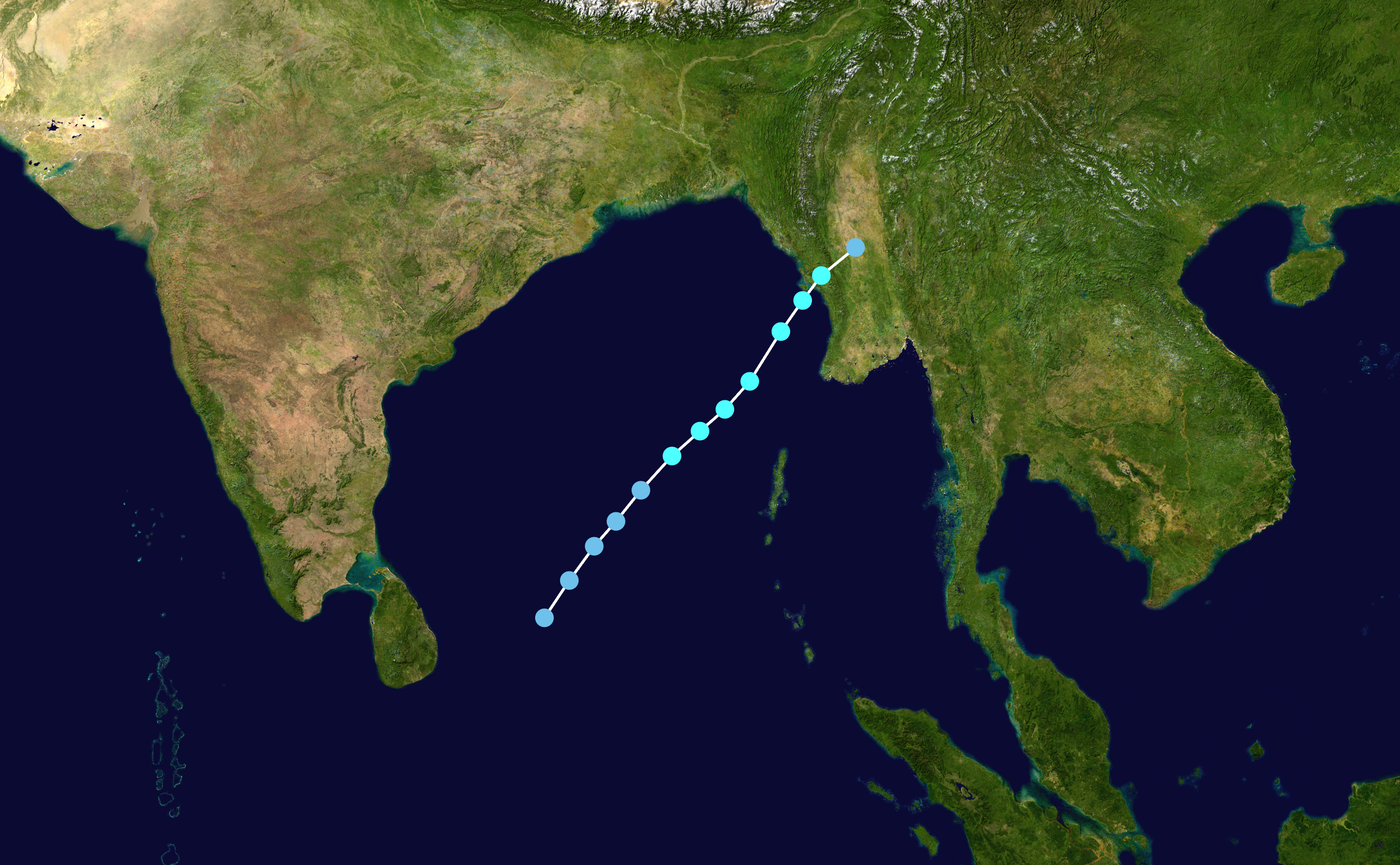
Map plotting the storm's track and intensity, according to the Saffir–Simpson scale Map key Saffir–Simpson scale Tropical depression (≤38 mph, ≤62 km/h) Tropical storm (39–73 mph, 63–118 km/h) Category 1 (74–95 mph, 119–153 km/h) Category 2 (96–110 mph, 154–177 km/h) Category 3 (111–129 mph, 178–208 km/h) Category 4 (130–156 mph, 209–251 km/h) Category 5 (≥157 mph, ≥252 km/h) Unknown Storm type Tropical cyclone Subtropical cyclone Extratropical cyclone, remnant low, tropical disturbance, or monsoon depression

On April 11, an upper air circulation developed over the Andaman Sea, where it moved north-eastwards and concentrated into a low pressure trough over the next day. The United States Joint Typhoon Warning Center (JTWC) started monitoring the system as a tropical disturbance on April 13, while it was some 880 mi (1,415 km) southwest of Yangon. JTWC reported that the disturbance was located within a favourable environment for further development and that convection had started to wrap into the elongated low level circulation centre. The system continued to develop and was classified as Depression BOB 01, by the India Meteorological Department (IMD) early on April 15.

== Preparations ==
=== Myanmar ===
The Union Minister for Social Welfare, Relief and Resettlement, the Vice President, ministers and disaster response team of Myanmar had an emergency meeting on the morning of April 16 to prepare rescue teams and arrange food and water stockpiles in disaster zones.

=== Andaman and Nicobar Islands ===
Shortly after the development was reported, the cyclone struck, causing severe waves and hence harm for people on the water.

== Impact and aftermath ==
=== Myanmar ===
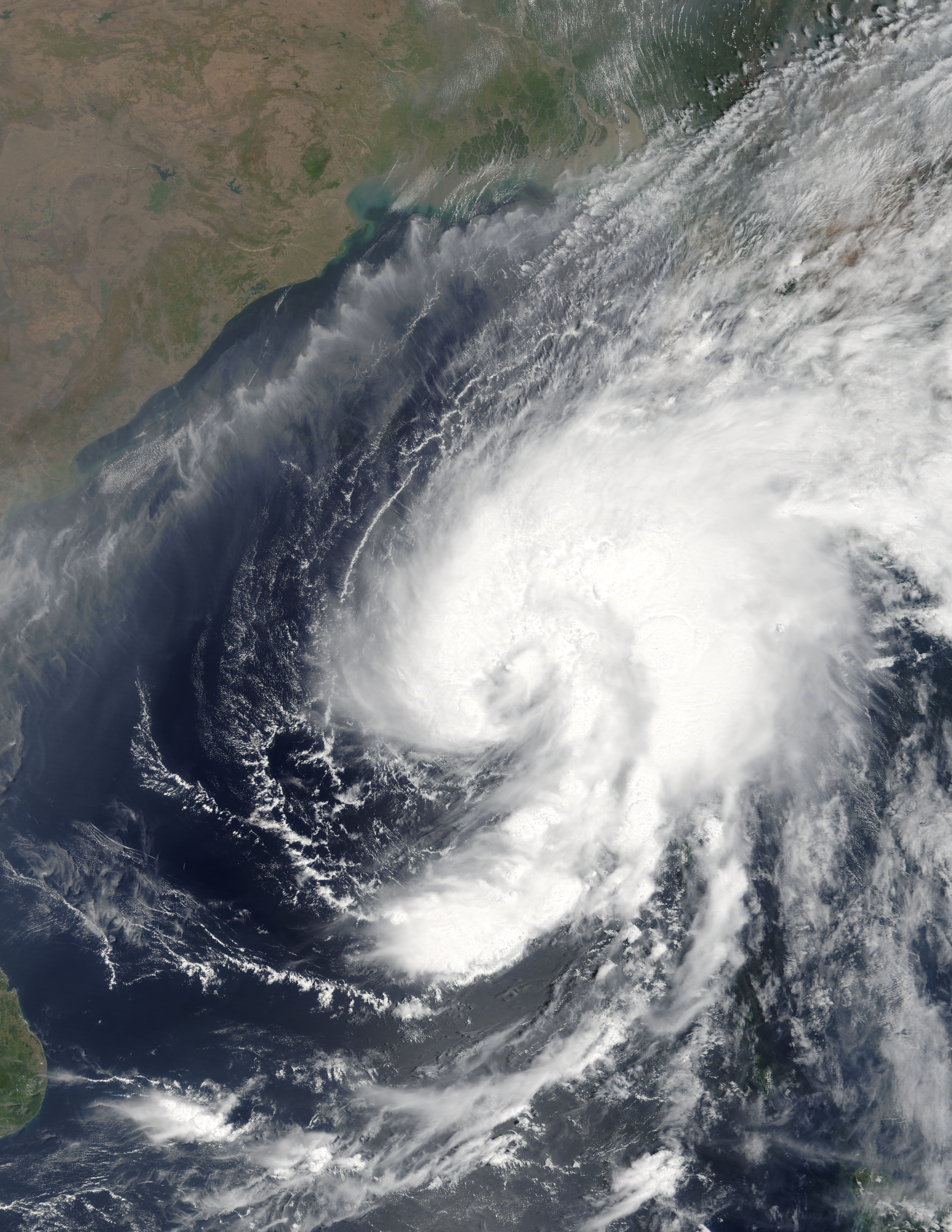
Maarutha as a Deep Depression on April 15

A total of 81 houses, worth about Ks3.7 million were damaged by the storm. Three houses were destroyed by fallen trees. Six lamp posts collapsed. Some houses had superficial damage as coconut palms collapsed on them. The Myanmar Meteorological Agency reported that accumulated rainfall for the 24 hours before April 17 at 9:30 a.m. local time totaled 3.7 inches (94 mm) for Bago. The town of Pyay received 5.4 inches (140 mm). In the Rahkine Region, the city of Kyauckpyu received 4.6 inches (120 mm) of rainfall in a 24-hour period. In the Mon State, Thaton, a town in southern Myanmar received 4.3 inches (110 mm) of rainfall. Four people were reported killed in the Ayeyarwady region of Myanmar.

=== India ===
Cyclone Maarutha, as a deep depression, left hundreds of tourists stranded in Havelock Island of Andaman and Nicobar Islands from heavy rainfall.

In Andhra Pradesh and Odisha, heatwave conditions worsened as the cyclone drew all the moisture towards itself resulting in severe hot and dry weather.

== Records ==
Myanmar shares the Bay of Bengal coast with neighbouring countries Bangladesh and India. It has experienced strong tropical cyclones from May to November. Notable destructive cyclones that affected Myanmar include Cyclone Nargis in 2008, Cyclone Giri in 2010 and Cyclone Mala in 2006. According to the IMD, Maarutha was the first ever cyclone to maintain peak intensity until landfall on Myanmar in the month of April. Cyclone Bijli in April 2009 weakened into a depression prior to landfall in Bangladesh.

== See also ==
- Weather of 2017
- Tropical cyclones in 2017
- Cyclone Bijli – a storm of similar intensity in 2009 that made landfall in Bangladesh
- Cyclone Mora – a strong tropical cyclone in 2017 which made landfall near Maarutha's landfall.
- Tropical cyclones in Myanmar – for other storms of similar nature.
