= Cyclone Bijli =

North Indian cyclone in 2009

Cyclonic Storm Bijli
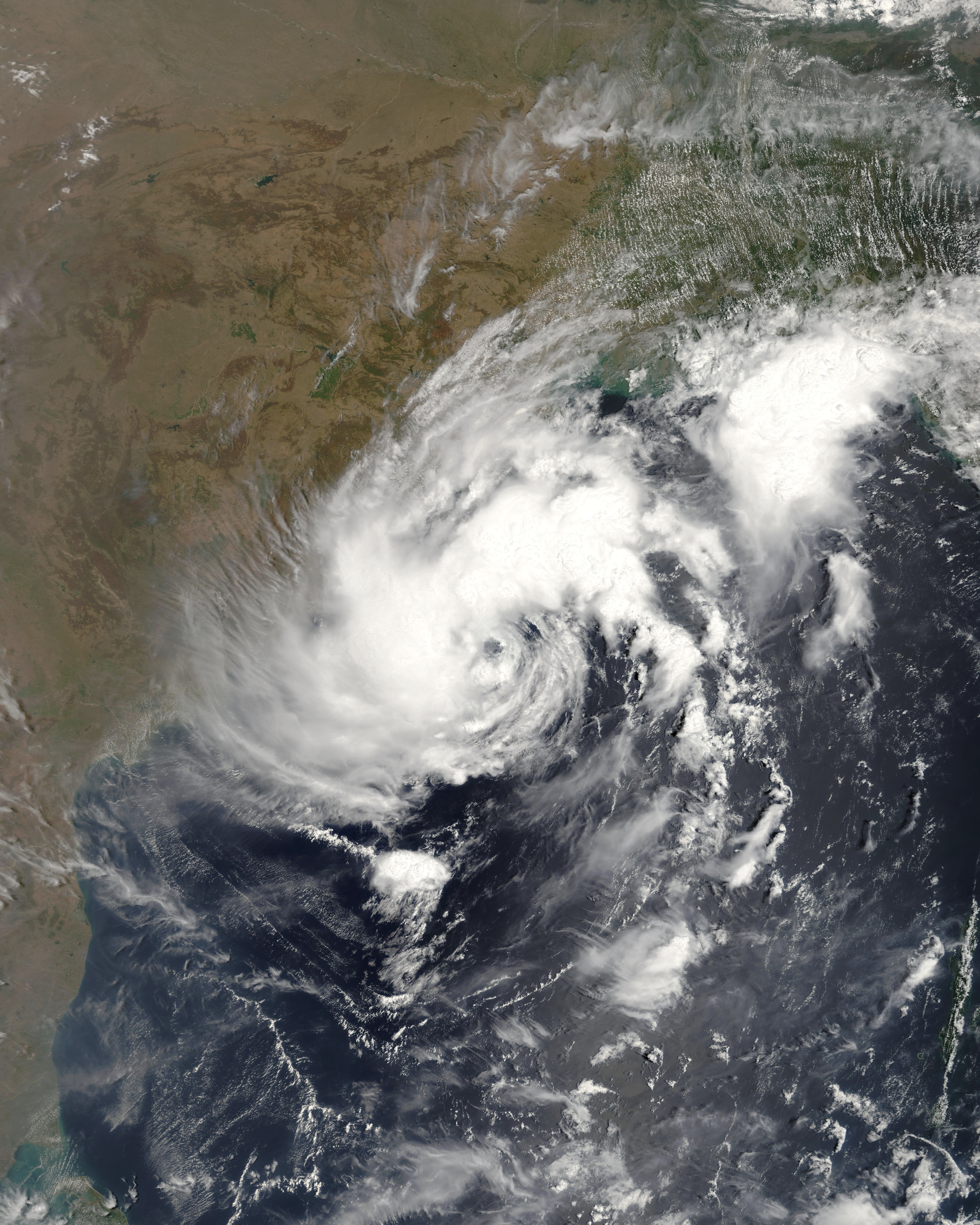
- Cyclone Bijli on April 16

Meteorological history
- Formed: April 14, 2009
- Dissipated: April 17, 2009

Cyclonic storm
- 3-minute sustained (IMD)
- Highest winds: 75 km/h (45 mph)
- Lowest pressure: 996 hPa (mbar); 29.41 inHg

Tropical storm
- 1-minute sustained (SSHWS/JTWC)
- Highest winds: 95 km/h (60 mph)
- Lowest pressure: 985 hPa (mbar); 29.09 inHg

Overall effects
- Fatalities: 4 direct, 3 indirect
- Areas affected: Eastern India, Bangladesh, Myanmar
- IBTrACS
- Part of the 2009 North Indian Ocean cyclone season

Cyclonic Storm Bijli (Note: The name Bijli (Hindi: बिजली; [bɪd͡ʒ.liː]) was contributed by India and means "lightning" in Hindi.) (JTWC designation: 01B) was the first tropical cyclone to form during the 2009 North Indian Ocean cyclone season. Bijli formed from an area of low pressure on April 14. Later that evening, RSMC New Delhi upgraded the low-pressure area to a Depression and designated it as BOB 01. The Joint Typhoon Warning Center (JTWC) then issued a Tropical Cyclone Formation Alert for the system and soon after designated it as Tropical Depression 01B. On the evening of April 15, both RSMC New Delhi and the JTWC reported that the system had intensified into a tropical storm, with the former naming it Bilji. Soon after, Bilji reached its peak intensity as it approached the coast of Bangladesh. However, on the morning of April 17, Bijli weakened to a deep depression due to land interaction, before making landfall just south of Chittagong. The remnants of Bilji continued to weaken as they tracked across northern Myanmar, before RSMC New Delhi issued their last advisory on April 18.

== Meteorological history ==
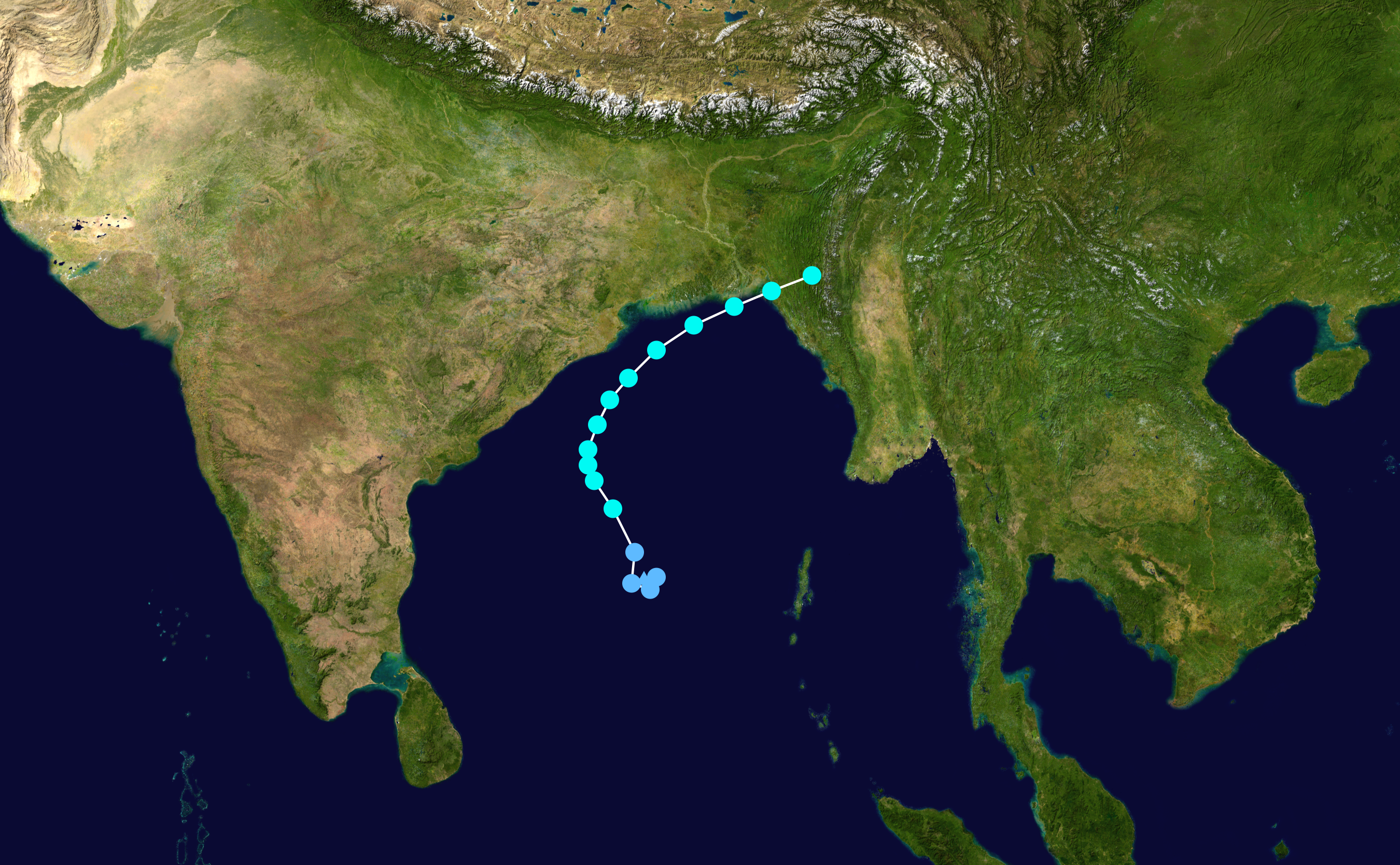
Map plotting the storm's track and intensity, according to the Saffir–Simpson scale Map key Saffir–Simpson scale Tropical depression (≤38 mph, ≤62 km/h) Tropical storm (39–73 mph, 63–118 km/h) Category 1 (74–95 mph, 119–153 km/h) Category 2 (96–110 mph, 154–177 km/h) Category 3 (111–129 mph, 178–208 km/h) Category 4 (130–156 mph, 209–251 km/h) Category 5 (≥157 mph, ≥252 km/h) Unknown Storm type Tropical cyclone Subtropical cyclone Extratropical cyclone, remnant low, tropical disturbance, or monsoon depression

On April 13, an area of shower and thunderstorms became slightly organized over the central Bay of Bengal. Later that day, an area of low pressure developed underneath the convection as the system developed. Weak banding features also formed around the periphery of the storm. By April 14, deep convection persisted around the center of circulation; following the development the RSMC in New Delhi, India designated the system as Depression BOB 01. Following further development, the Joint Typhoon Warning Center (JTWC) issued a Tropical Cyclone Formation Alert (TCFA) as they anticipated the system to develop into a tropical storm. Early the next morning the JTWC reported that the depression had intensified into a tropical storm and designated it as Cyclone 01B. The storm tracked towards the west-northwest due to a mid-level ridge over India. Later that morning RSMC New Delhi reported that the depression had intensified into a deep depression and reported it was expected to intensify into Cyclonic Storm Bijli. Around 1500 UTC, the RSMC New Delhi upgraded the system to a cyclonic storm and gave it the name Bijli. Partial convective banding developed around the periphery of the system as it intensified. The conditions for good outflow were present but did not develop. Around this time, the forward motion of the storm also slowed. On April 16, the storm turned towards the northeast, paralleling the eastern coast of India. Around 0600 UTC, RSMC New Delhi reported that Bijli had reached its peak intensity with winds of 75 km/h (45 mph 3-minute winds). Early on April 17, RSMC New Delhi reported that Bijli had weakened into a deep depression as it started to move the northeast.

== Preparations, impact and aftermath ==
=== India ===
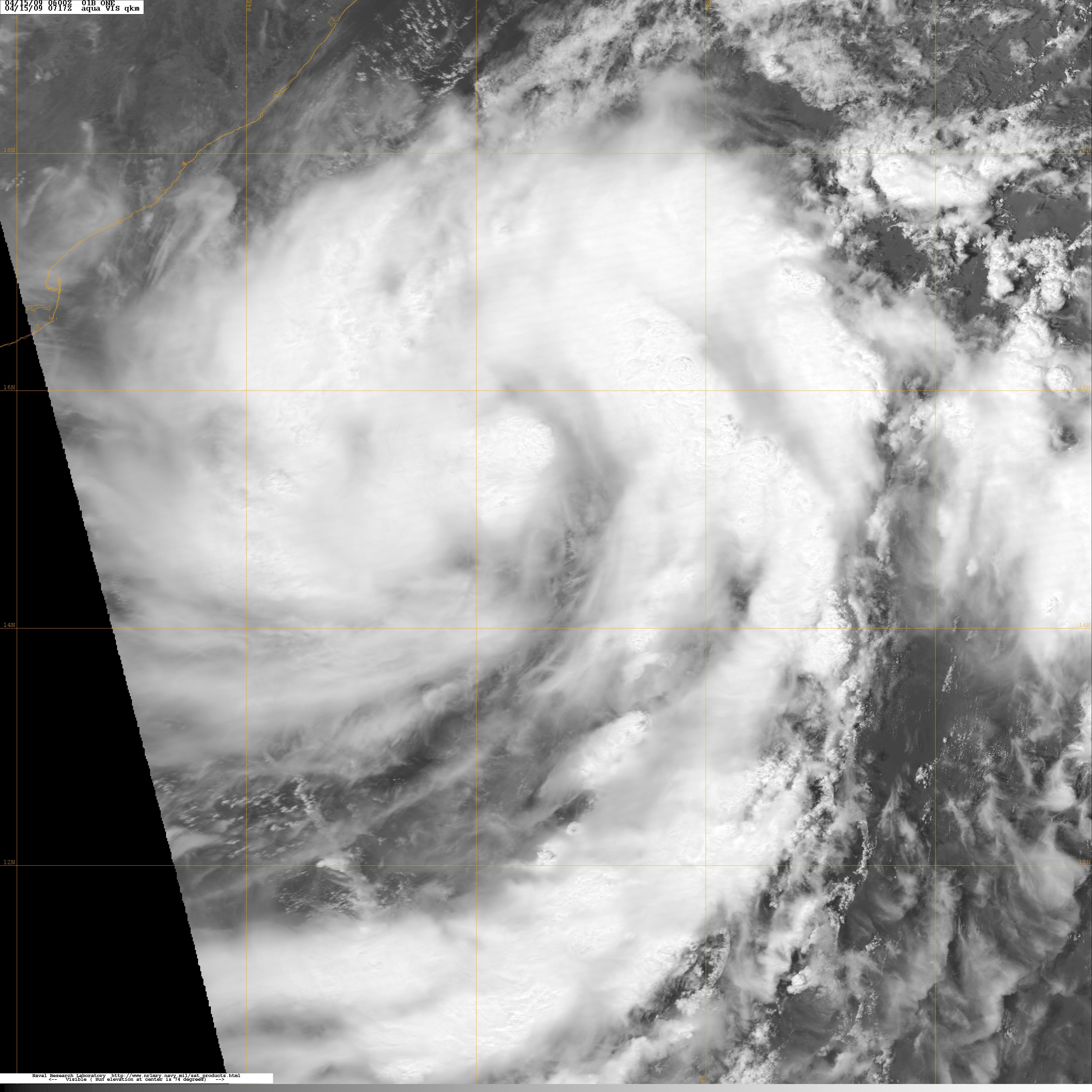
Bijli as a Deep Depression on April 15

All four parts in Odisha were placed on high alert due to rough seas produced by the storm. A Local Cautionary Signal Number Three was issued for the Gopalpur, Puri, Paradeep and Chandabali ports. Heavy rain from thunderstorms fell in Andhra and Orissa due to the outer bands of Bijli. Winds up to 55 km/h (35 mph) were also reported along the coast.

=== Bangladesh ===
In Bangladesh, at least 40,000 volunteers from the Bangladeshi Red Cross were placed on standby in case evacuations were required. Bangladeshi officials urged all ports to be on high alert and all fishermen to stay at port. The warning signal was placed at No. 3 on a scale of 1 to 10, with 10 being the highest level of warning. Thousands of residents on Maheshkhali Island evacuated to 80 shelters. As the storm neared landfall, ports in Chittagong raised their warning level to seven. Following the increased warning level, an estimated 10,000 evacuated from coastal regions. Weather officials estimated that the storm would produce a storm surge of 2.1 to 3 m (7 to 10 ft). On April 17, all flights in and out of Bangladesh were cancelled due to dangerous conditions. Shelters were also opened and were reportedly able to accommodate about one million people. In Chittagong, 6,000 volunteers set up to assist in the aftermath of the storm and about 283 medical teams formed within the group. An estimated 200,000 people evacuated from Chittagong and the Cox's Bazar District before the storm made landfall.

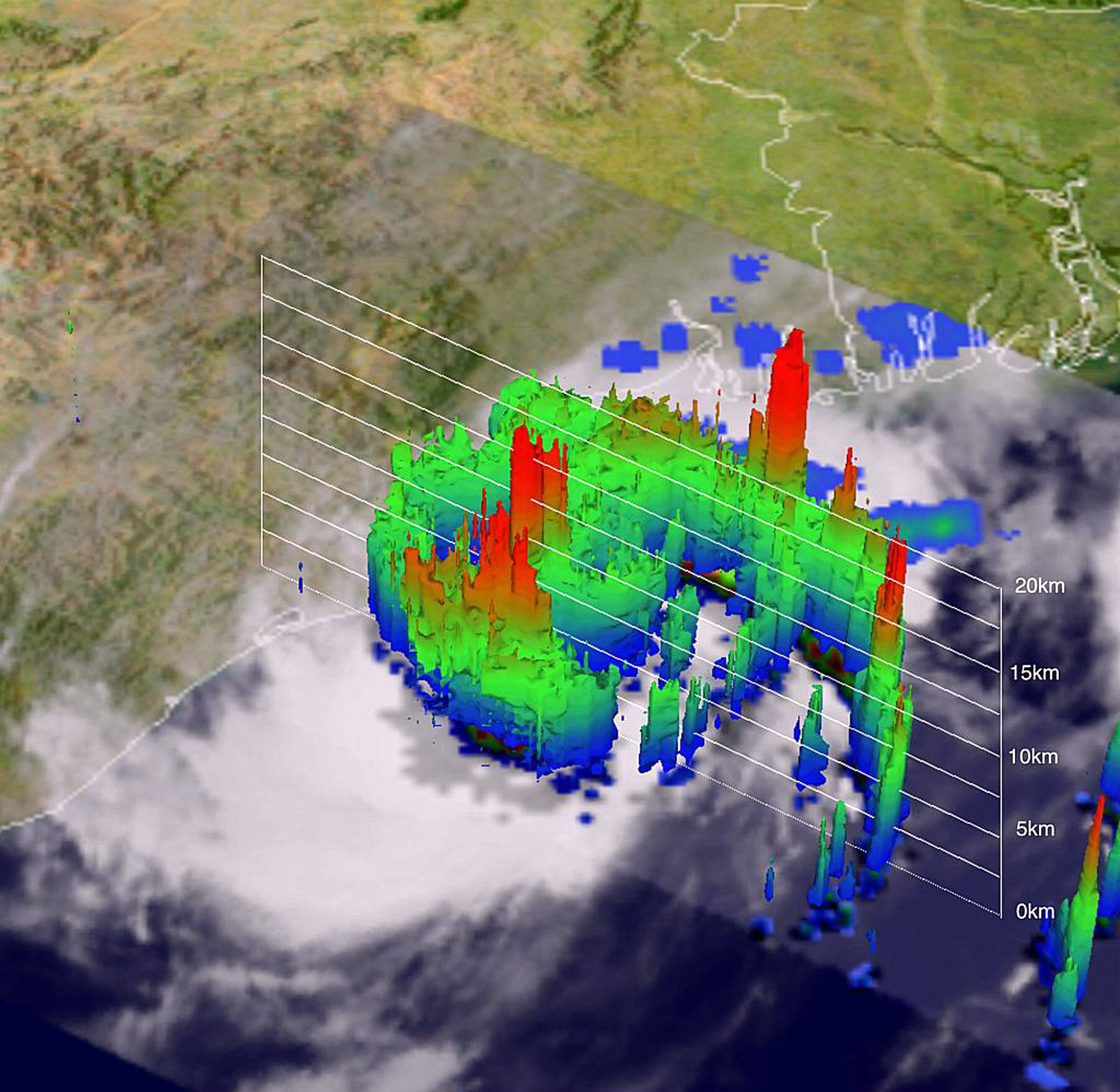
3D TRMM image of Bijli on April 16 at peak intensity

The Tropical Rainfall Measuring Mission satellite, jointly operated by NASA and JAXA, estimated that Bijli produced a maximum of 129 mm (5.1 in) of rain over coastal Bangladesh, with rainfall rates reaching nearly 50 mm/h (2 in/h). High winds downed several trees; numerous homes sustained damage and several ships on offshore islands were reportedly caught in the storm. High winds and heavy rains have also knocked out power to some communities. A storm surge of 2.1 m (7 ft) was recorded in the Cox's Bazar District with reports higher amounts in localized areas. At least 12 huts, 50 betel beef fields, and a large amount of salt have been damaged by the storm. Later reports indicated that thousands of homes have been damaged or destroyed by the storm. The first fatality caused by Bijli occurred when a tree knocked down by high winds fell on a 9-year-old boy, killing him on impact and injuring his sister. In the Cox's Bazar District, a school teacher and two students were killed. One of the two children was trampled to death during the evacuation. The other child was killed when his home collapsed on top of him.

Wettest tropical cyclones and their remnants in Bangladesh Highest-known totals
Precipitation			Storm	Location	Ref.
Rank	mm	in	Storm	Location	Ref.
1	1,051.2	41.39	Komen 2015	Chittagong	
2	~300	~12.00	Rashmi 2008		
3	280	11.02	Monsoon Depression — Sep. 2004	Barisal	
4	253	10.00	Viyaru 2013	Patuakhali	
5	227.2	8.94	Trop. Depression — Oct. 2004	Rangpur	
6	220.0	8.66	Bhola 1970	Maya Bandar	
7	200	7.87	Sidr 2007		
8	130	5.11	Aila 2009	Chittagong	
9	129	5.07	Bijli 2009		
10	53	2.13	Akash 2007		

During the evacuation, a 48-year-old man collapsed and died after suffering a heart attack. His child, who was only a few months old, also died from medical circumstances which were aggravated during the evacuation. In all, the storm destroyed 500 thatched houses and 1,500 betel leaf plantations and flooded about 70,000 acres (280 km^{2}) of cropland. Throughout Bangladesh, seven people were killed and 84 were injured. A total of 702 homes were destroyed and more than 3,825 others were damaged as well as 3,636 acres (14.71 km^{2}) of agricultural land. In the Cox's Bazar District, 607 head of livestock drowned during the storm. Following the impacts of Bijli, the Government of Bangladesh allocated Tk. 79,000 (US$1,147) in assistance to affected population. The Department of Relief and Rehabilitation in Bangladesh provided 450 metric tonnes of rice to four districts, 200 of which was sent to Chittagong. To prevent an outbreak of post-storm diseases, the World Health Organization activated 1,105 medical teams in the country.

=== Myanmar ===
A storm surge of 1.8 to 2.4 m (6 to 8 ft) was also expected to impact coastal areas of Myanmar close to the Bangladeshi border. An estimated 6,000 fishing trawlers were to return to port by the afternoon of April 17. Following the devastating results of Cyclone Nargis almost a year prior, officials in Myanmar urged residents along the coast to evacuate. Thousands of residents living in rural villages sought shelter in inland towns along the coast of Myanmar. The entire village of Aukpyunewa evacuated after hearing about an approaching cyclone on the radio. According to local residents, "We are taking precautions unlike earlier" in reference to the large loss of life due to Cyclone Nargis. The storm produced little or no storm surge in Myanmar as it made landfall; however, the remnants of Bijli produced heavy rains over northern areas of the country before the storm dissipated.

== See also ==
- 2009 North Indian Ocean cyclone season
- Cyclone Maarutha- A storm of similar intensity in 2017 that made landfall in Myanmar
