= 2009 North Indian Ocean cyclone season =

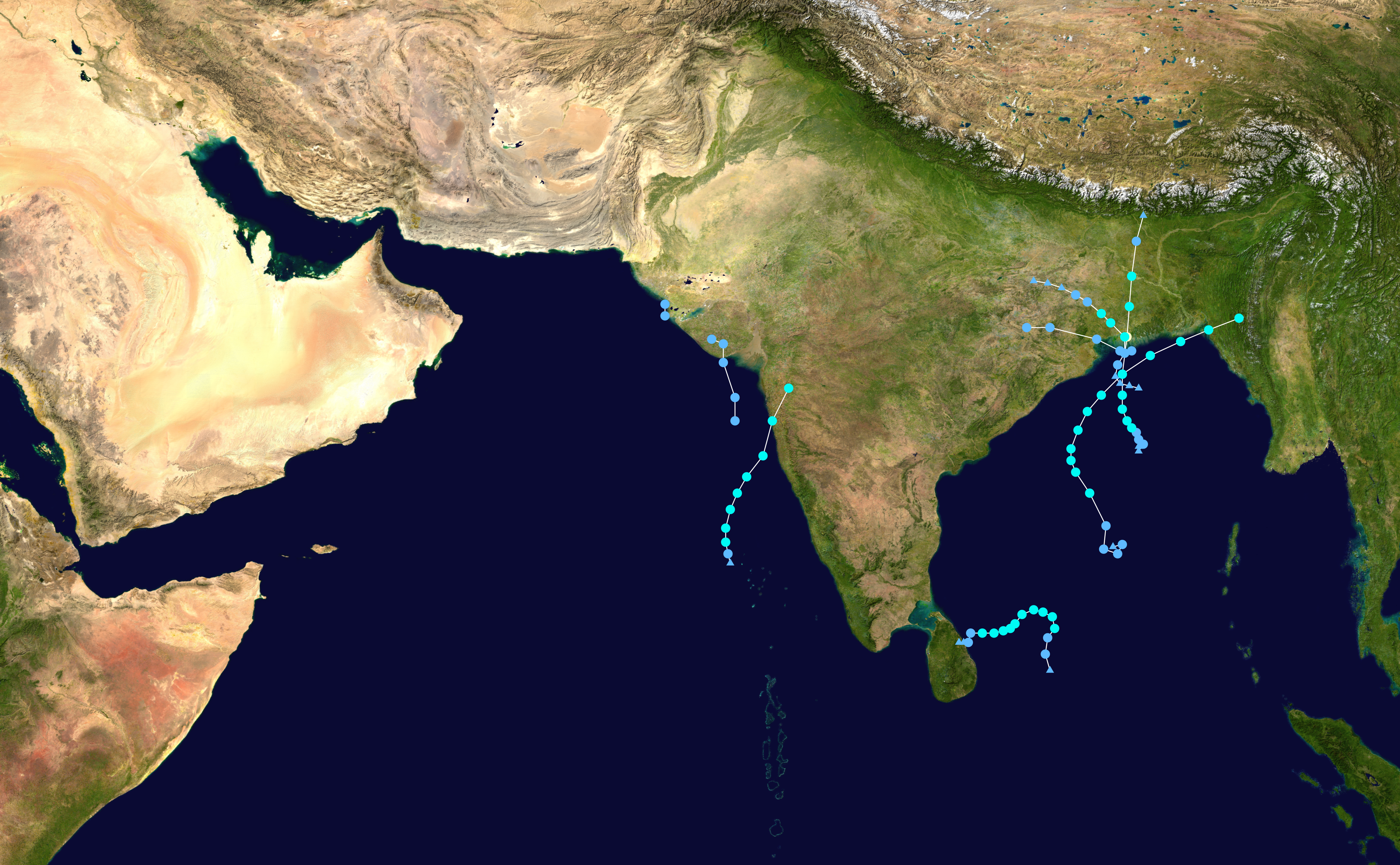
- Season summary map

Seasonal boundaries
- First system formed: April 14, 2009
- Last system dissipated: December 16, 2009

Strongest storm
- Name: Aila
  - Maximum winds: 110 km/h (70 mph) (3-minute sustained)
  - Lowest pressure: 968 hPa (mbar)

Seasonal statistics
- Depressions: 8
- Deep depressions: 6
- Cyclonic storms: 4
- Severe cyclonic storms: 1
- Total fatalities: 419 total
- Total damage: $1.3 billion (2009 USD)

Related articles
- Timeline of the 2009 North Indian Ocean cyclone season; 2009 Atlantic hurricane season; 2009 Pacific hurricane season; 2009 Pacific typhoon season

The 2009 North Indian Ocean cyclone season was an average season in terms of the number of cyclonic storms, however the storms were mostly weak in nature. It was the first season since 2005 wherein a storm did not strength above severe cyclonic storm status. The North Indian Ocean cyclone season has no official bounds, but cyclones tend to form between April and December, with peaks in May and November. These dates conventionally delimit the period of each year when most tropical cyclones form in the northern Indian Ocean.

The scope of this article is limited to the Indian Ocean in the Northern Hemisphere, east of the Horn of Africa and west of the Malay Peninsula. There are two main seas in the North Indian Ocean — the Arabian Sea to the west of the Indian subcontinent, abbreviated ARB by the India Meteorological Department (IMD); and the Bay of Bengal to the east, abbreviated BOB by the IMD.

The official Regional Specialized Meteorological Centre in this basin is the India Meteorological Department (IMD), while the Joint Typhoon Warning Center releases unofficial advisories. The tropical cyclone scale for this basin is detailed on the right. On average, 4 to 6 storms form in this basin every season.

== Systems ==
=== Cyclonic Storm Bijli ===
- Cyclonic storm (IMD)
- Tropical storm (SSHWS)
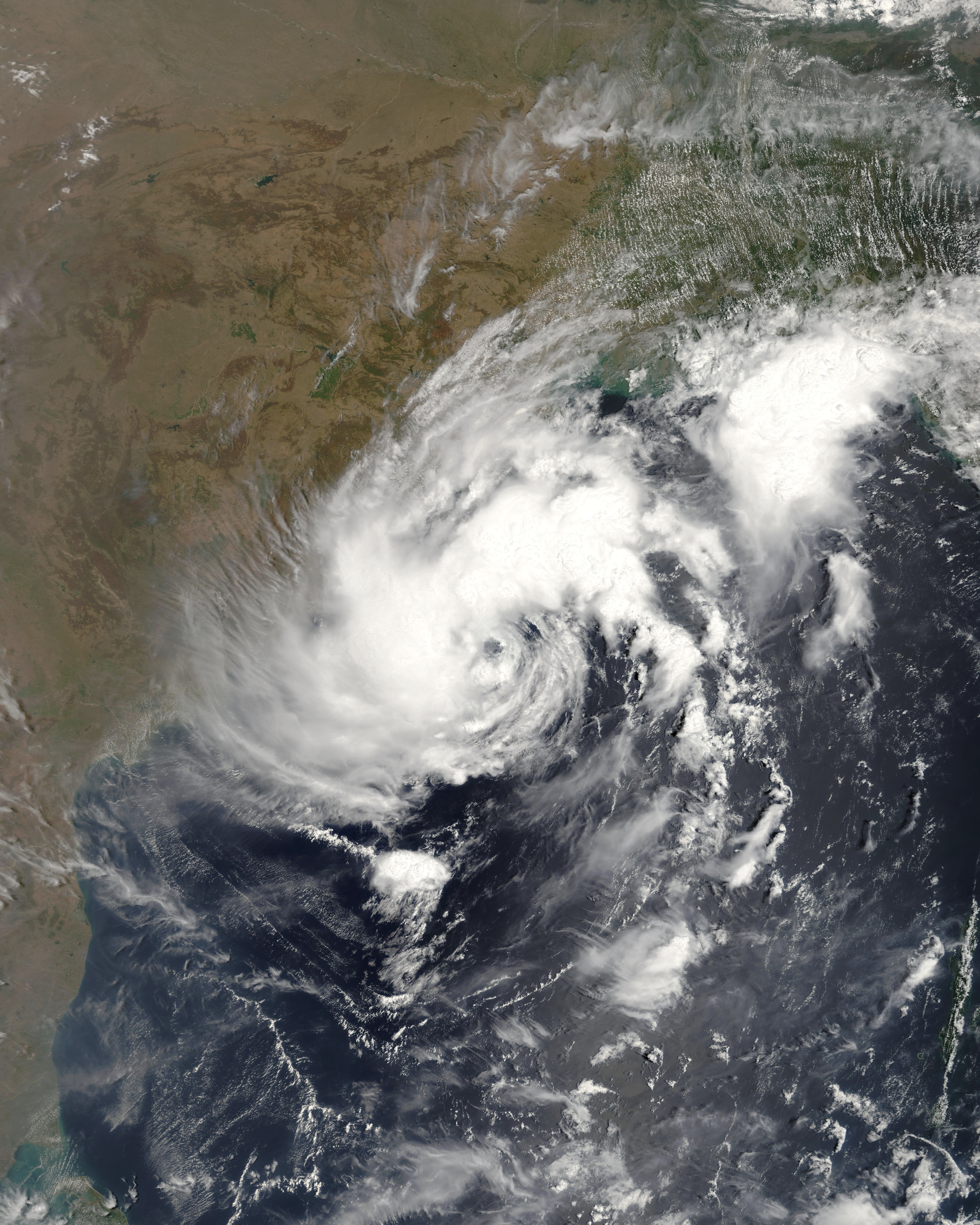
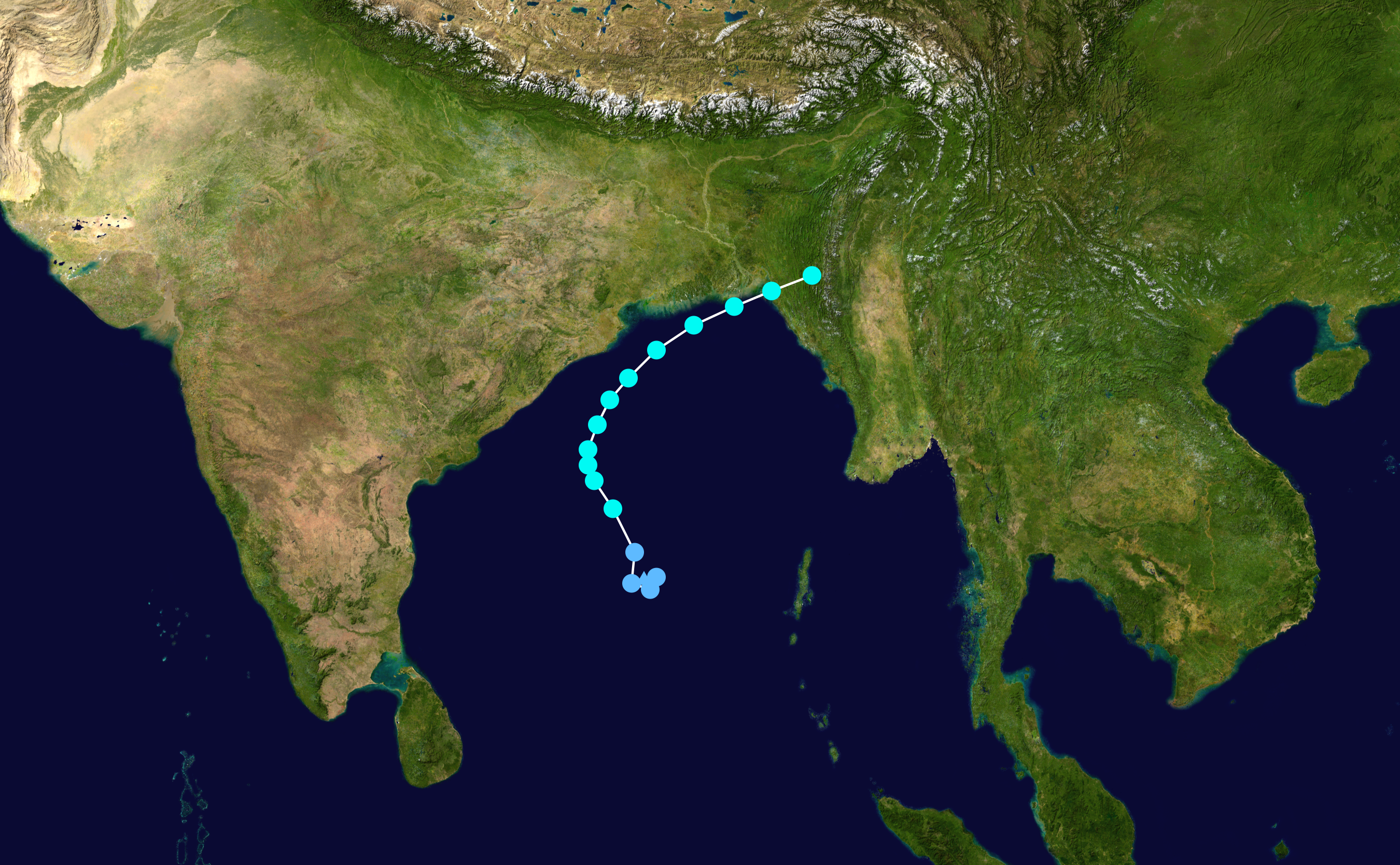
- Duration: April 14 – April 17
- Peak intensity: 75 km/h (45 mph) (3-min); 996 hPa (mbar)

On April 13, an area of shower and thunderstorms became slightly organized over the central Bay of Bengal. Later that day, an area of low pressure developed underneath the convection as the system developed. Weak banding features also formed around the periphery of the storm. By April 14, deep convection persisted around the center of circulation; following the development the RSMC in New Delhi, India designated the system as Depression BOB 01. Following further development, the Joint Typhoon Warning Center (JTWC) issued a Tropical Cyclone Formation Alert (TCFA) as they anticipated the system to develop into a tropical storm. Early the next morning the JTWC reported that the depression had intensified into a tropical storm and designated it as Cyclone 01B. The storm tracked towards the west-northwest due to a mid-level ridge over India. Later that morning RSMC New Delhi reported that the depression had intensified into a deep depression and reported it was expected to intensify into a cyclonic storm. Around 1500 UTC, the RSMC New Delhi upgraded the system to a cyclonic storm and gave it the name Bijli. (Note: The name Bijli (Hindi: बिजली, [bɪd͡ʒ.liː]) was contributed by India and means "lightning" in Hindi.) All four ports in Orissa were placed on high alert due to rough seas produced by the storm. A Local Cautionary Signal Number Three was issued for the Gopalpur, Puri, Paradeep and Chandabali ports. On April 16, the storm turned towards the northeast, paralleling the eastern coast of India. Around 0600 UTC, RSMC New Delhi reported that Bijli had reached its peak intensity with winds of 75 km/h (45 mph 3-minute winds). Early on April 17, RSMC New Delhi reported that Bijli had weakened to a deep depression as it moved northwest. Later, RSMC New Delhi downgraded the deep depression to a depression. Late on April 17, RSMC New Delhi reported that Depression ex-Bijli had made landfall near Chittagong, Bangladesh and had rapidly become an area of low pressure over Bangladesh. Maximum winds of 30 knots (56 km/h) were reported in Cox's Bazar and 3 people were killed in Bangladesh. That night, the JTWC issued their final advisory on Tropical Cyclone 01B as it rapidly weakened over Bangladesh and Myanmar.

Bijli developed as a depression in the first fortnight of April. Climatologically, the formation of tropical cyclones in the Bay of Bengal at this time of the year is rare. Only ten cyclones have developed over the Bay of Bengal during 1891–2008.

=== Severe Cyclonic Storm Aila ===
- Severe cyclonic storm (IMD)
- Category 1 tropical cyclone (SSHWS)
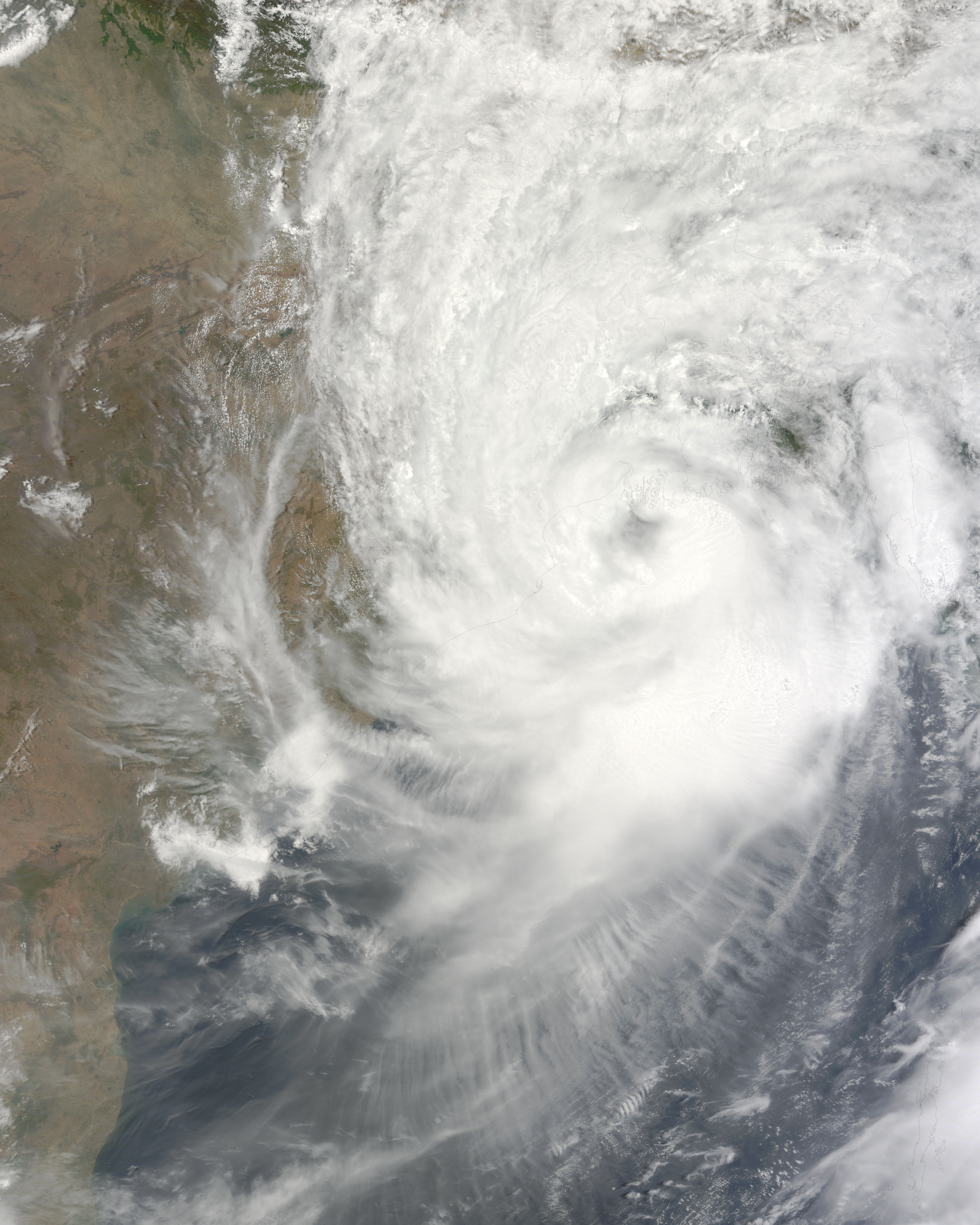
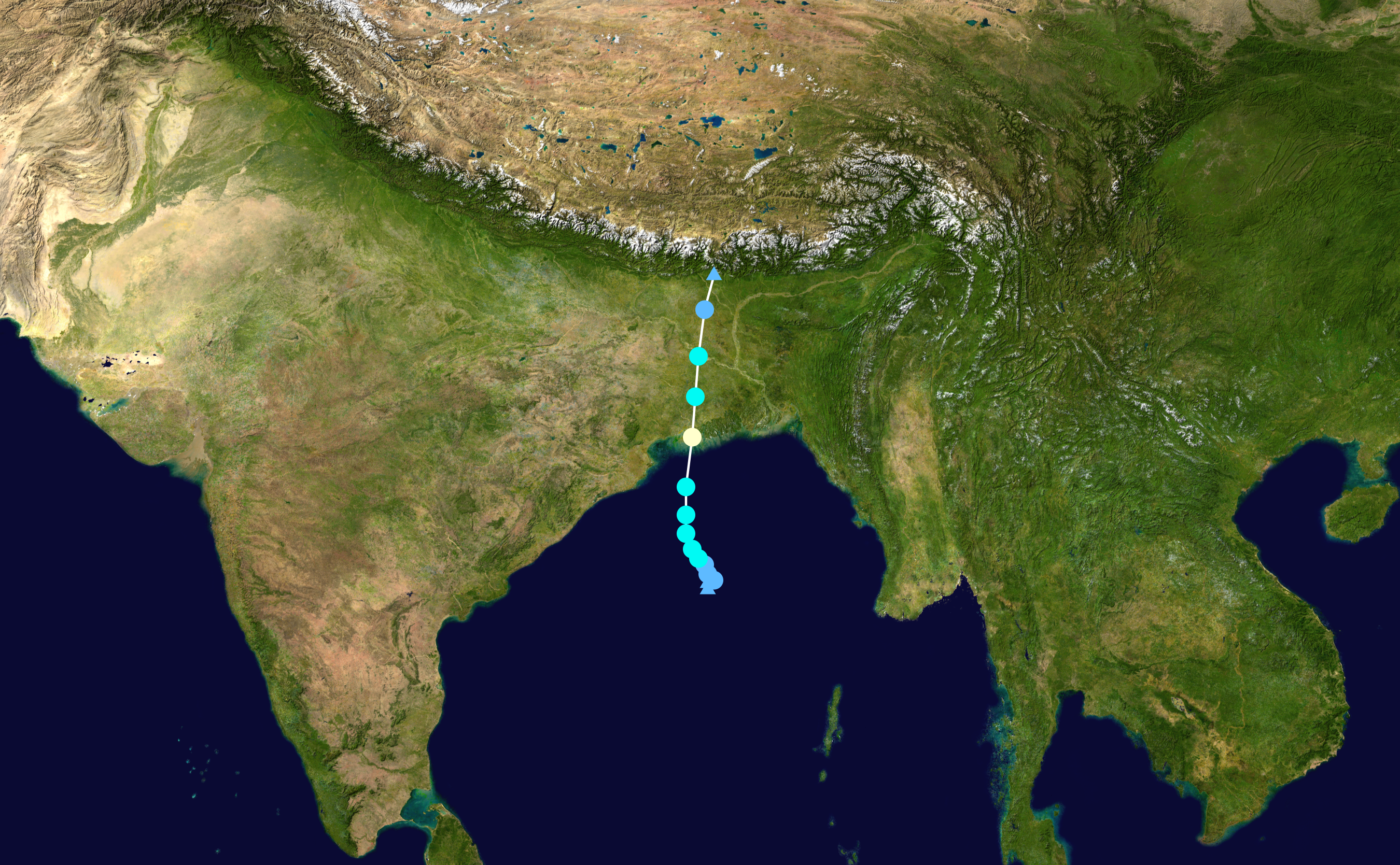
- Duration: May 23 – May 26
- Peak intensity: 110 km/h (70 mph) (3-min); 968 hPa (mbar)

Late on May 21, the JTWC reported that a Tropical Disturbance had persisted about 515 nm to the south of Kolkata, India. The disturbance at this time had a broad and poorly organised area of deep convection, which was located to the southeast of the low level circulation center which had consolidated into a single circulation during the previous 12 hours. Environmental analysis indicated that the system was in an area of favorable conditions to develop with low vertical wind shear and warm sea surface temperatures. During May 22 the disturbance developed further with a Tropical Cyclone Formation Alert being issued early the next day by the JTWC as the low level circulation center had become stronger and more defined. Later that morning RSMC New Delhi designated the disturbance as Depression BOB 02, later strengthening to a cyclonic storm named Aila. (Note: The name Aila (Dhivehi: އައިލަ, [ʔai.la]) was contributed by the Maldives and refers to the pompano dolphinfish (Coryphaena equiselis) in Dhivehi.)

Aila crossed the West Bengal coast close to the east of Sagar Island between 0800 & 0900 UTC as a severe cyclonic storm on 25 May. A maximum wind gust of 112 km/h was recorded in Kalaikunda in West Bengal. Singlabazar recorded 320 mm of rainfall in 48 hours between 26 and 27 May.

=== Depression ARB 01 ===
- Depression (IMD)
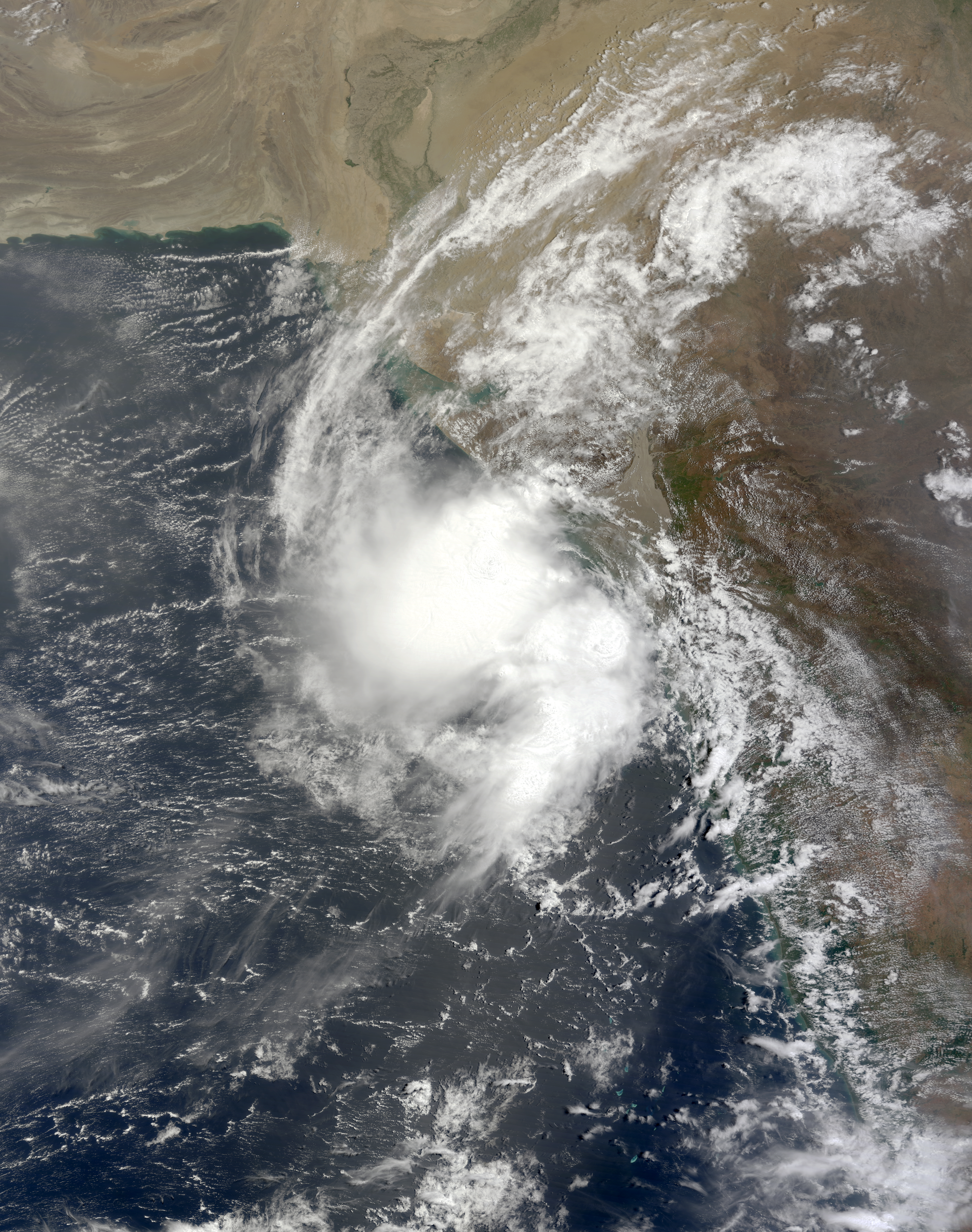
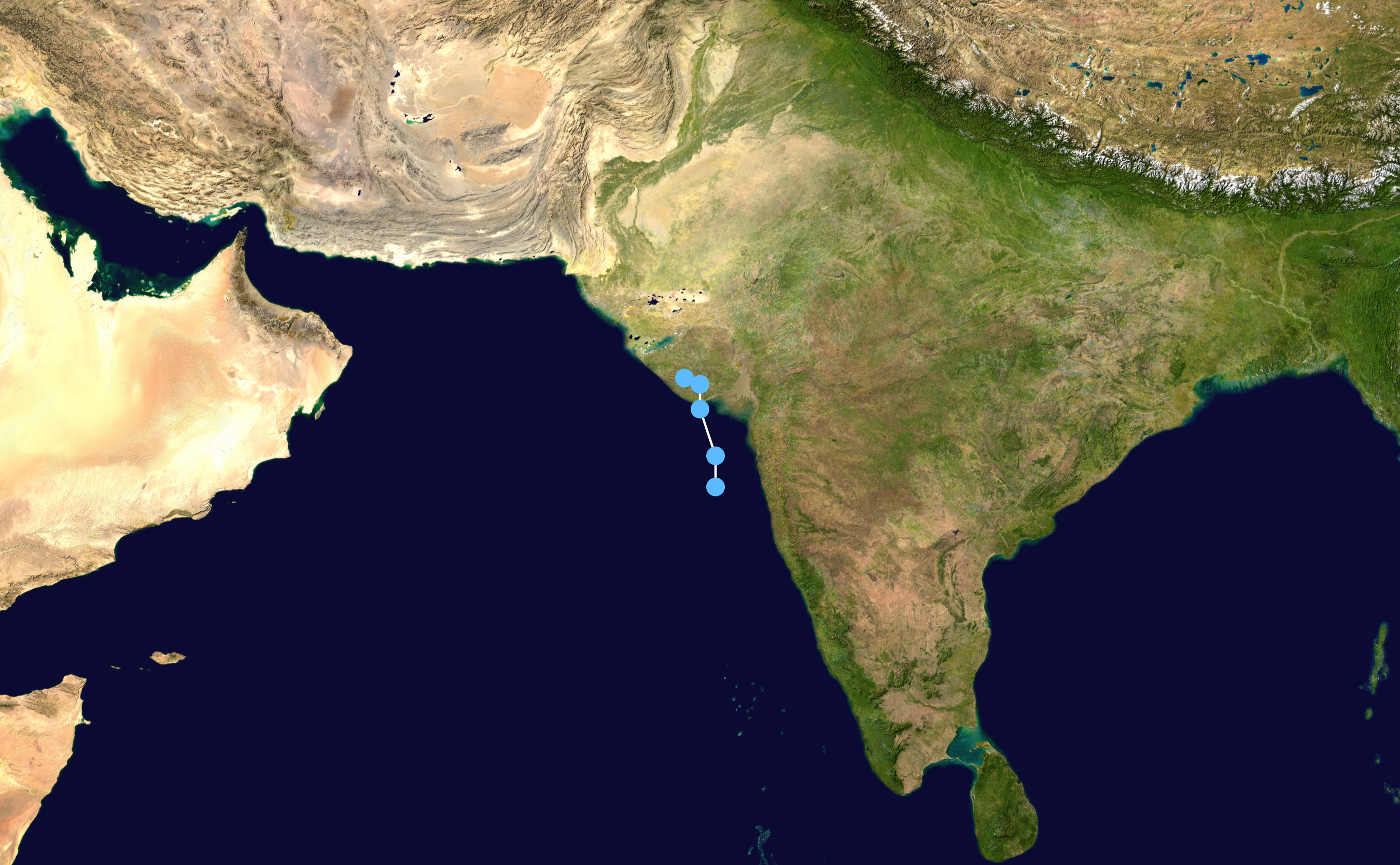
- Duration: June 23 – June 24
- Peak intensity: 45 km/h (30 mph) (3-min); 998 hPa (mbar)

Early on June 21, the JTWC reported that an area of low pressure had persisted about 675 km, (420 miles), southwest of Mumbai, India. Multispectral imagery showed that the disturbance had a developing low level circulation center with convection flaring over it and was in an area of low vertical wind shear. Over the next couple of days the disturbance developed gradually with a Tropical Cyclone Formation Alert being issued early on June 23 as the disturbance had continued to organize and consolidated over the past few hours. RSMC New Delhi then reported later that morning that Depression ARB 01 had formed and was expected to intensify into a Deep Depression before making landfall, however the depression did not intensify any further before making landfall on the south Gujarat coast near Diu. The JTWC then cancelled their Tropical Cyclone Formation Alert, with the IMD issuing their final advisory later that day. It hovered over Gujarat as a well marked area of low pressure before moving towards the northeast and re-emerging into the Arabian Sea where it redeveloped into a depression. Tropical Depression ARB 01 dissipated early on June 26.

Unusually strong lightning storms associated with the depression killed at least nine people in Gujarat. Officials in the region warned residents about the likelihood of severe flooding from the depression. Sutrapada in Gujarat received 250 mm rainfall in 48 hours between 24 & 25 June.

=== Depression ARB 02 ===
- Depression (IMD)
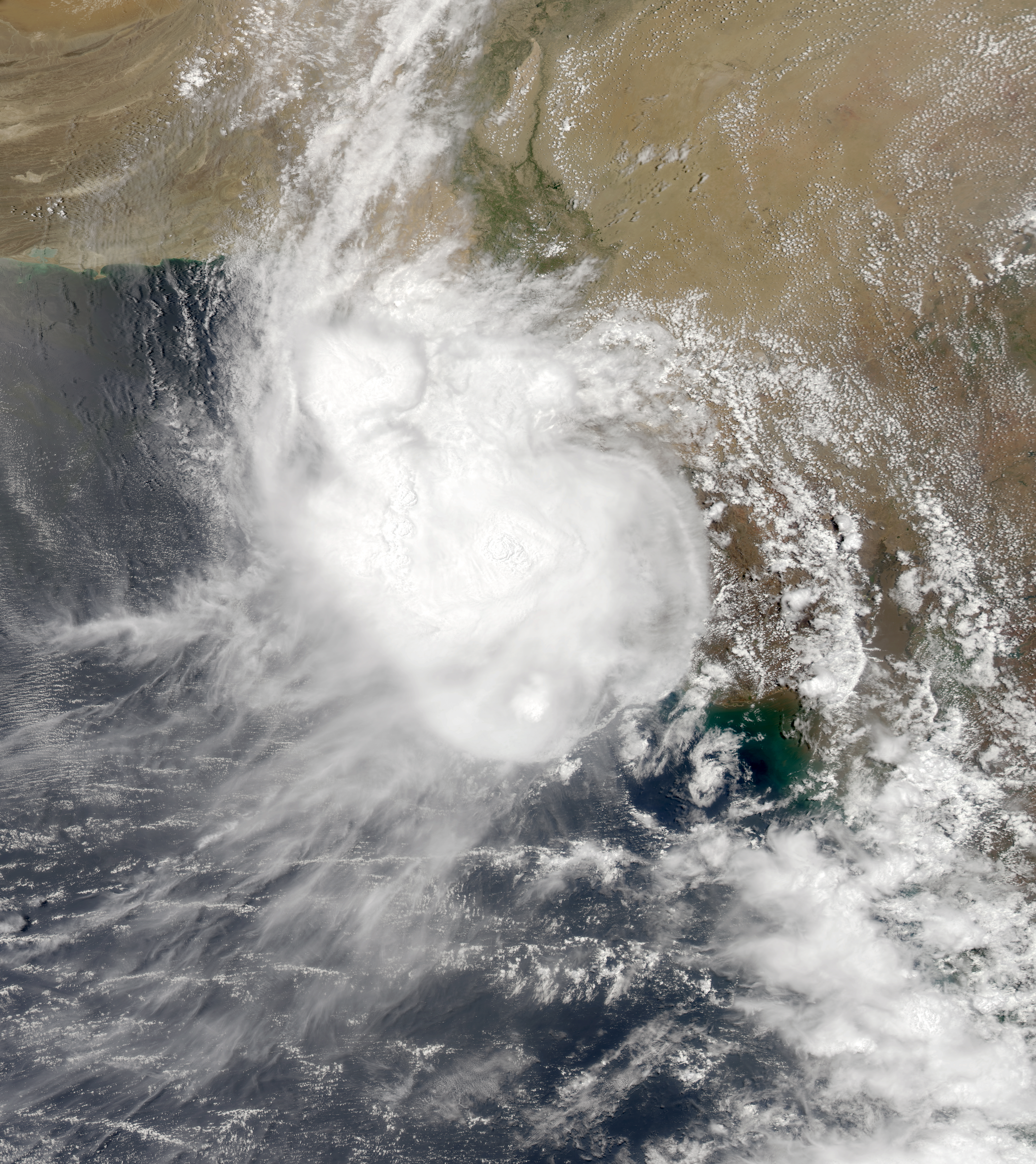
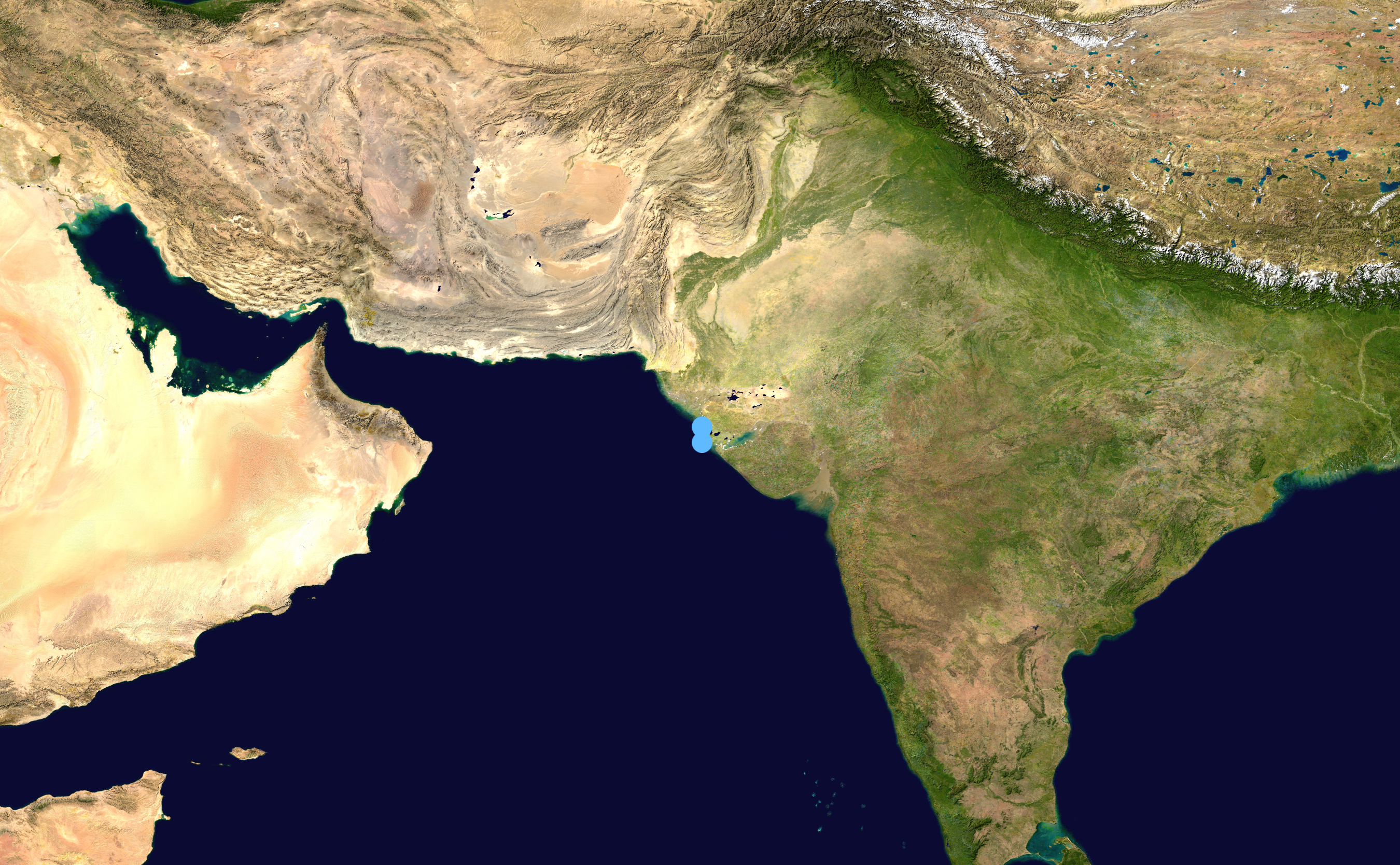
- Duration: June 25 – June 25
- Peak intensity: 45 km/h (30 mph) (3-min); 996 hPa (mbar)

Early on June 25 at 0900 UTC, the remnants of Depression ARB 01 emerged into the Arabian Sea, and intensified into Depression ARB 02. The storm moved northward, weakened, and maintained its intensity as a well marked low-pressure area over Kutch and neighbouring areas at 0000 UTC on 26 June 2009. Saurashtra and Kutch experienced active monsoon conditions under the influence of this system. Like its parent system, it was mostly monitored through synoptic and satellite analysis. It was a short-lived system, existing for about 25 hours. As a result, it did not have any significant impact on rainfall, except over Saurashtra & Kutch.

Moving in a north-northwesterly direction, the Depression, which was located over Saurashtra, Kutch, and neighbouring areas, which was the system, re-intensified into the depression over northeast Arabian Sea, and lay centred near lat. 22.50N/long. 68.50E about 50 km west-northwest of Dwarka and 300 km south-southeast of Karachi at 0900 UTC on 25 June. Moving slowing in a northerly direction, the system weakened into a well marked low-pressure area at 0000 UTC on 26 June over Kutch and its neighbouring regions. However, later on June 26, Depression ARB 02 dissipated completely. Mangrol in Gujarat recorded 130 mm of rainfall on 27 June.

=== Deep Depression BOB 03 ===
- Deep depression (IMD)
- Tropical depression (SSHWS)
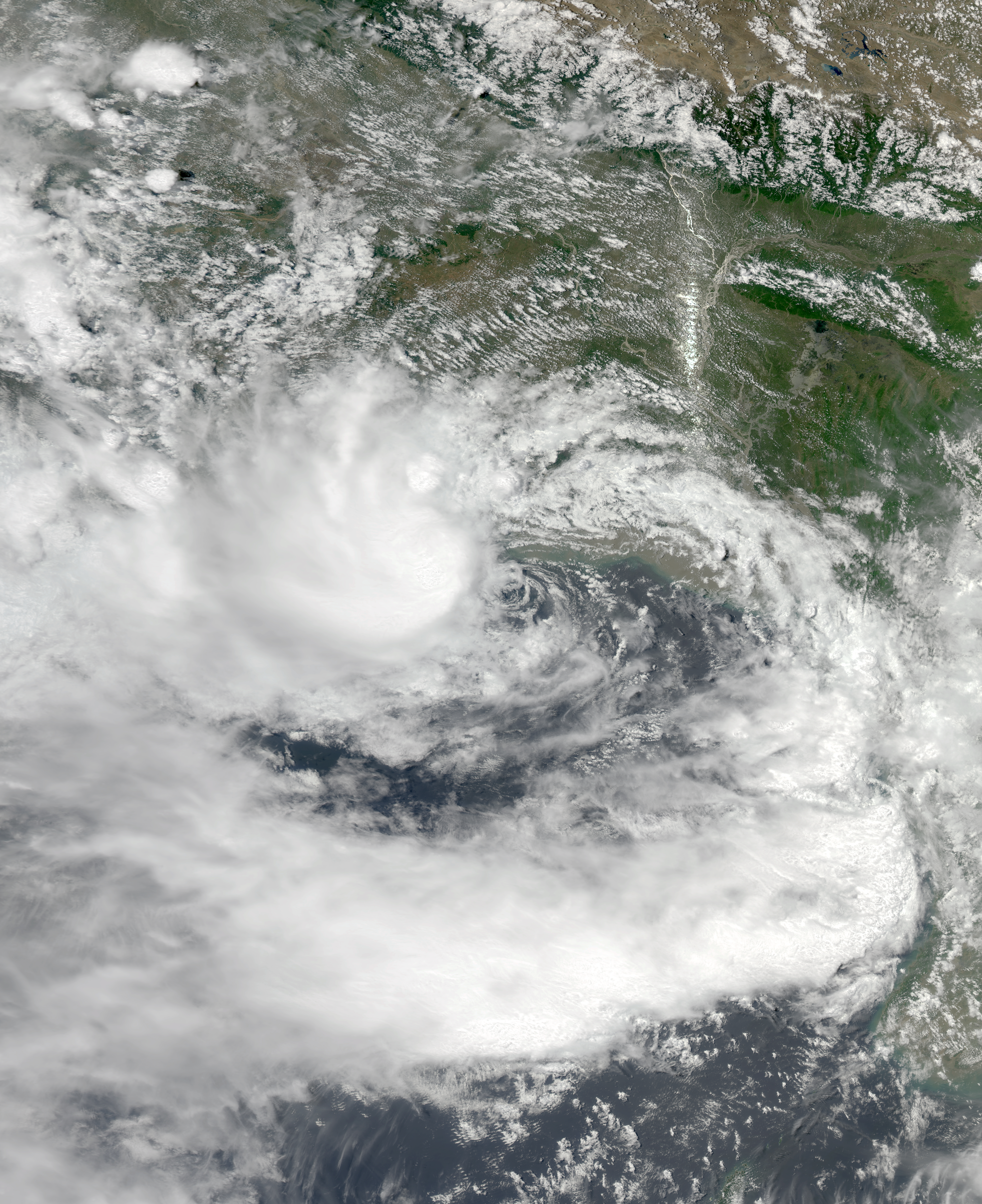
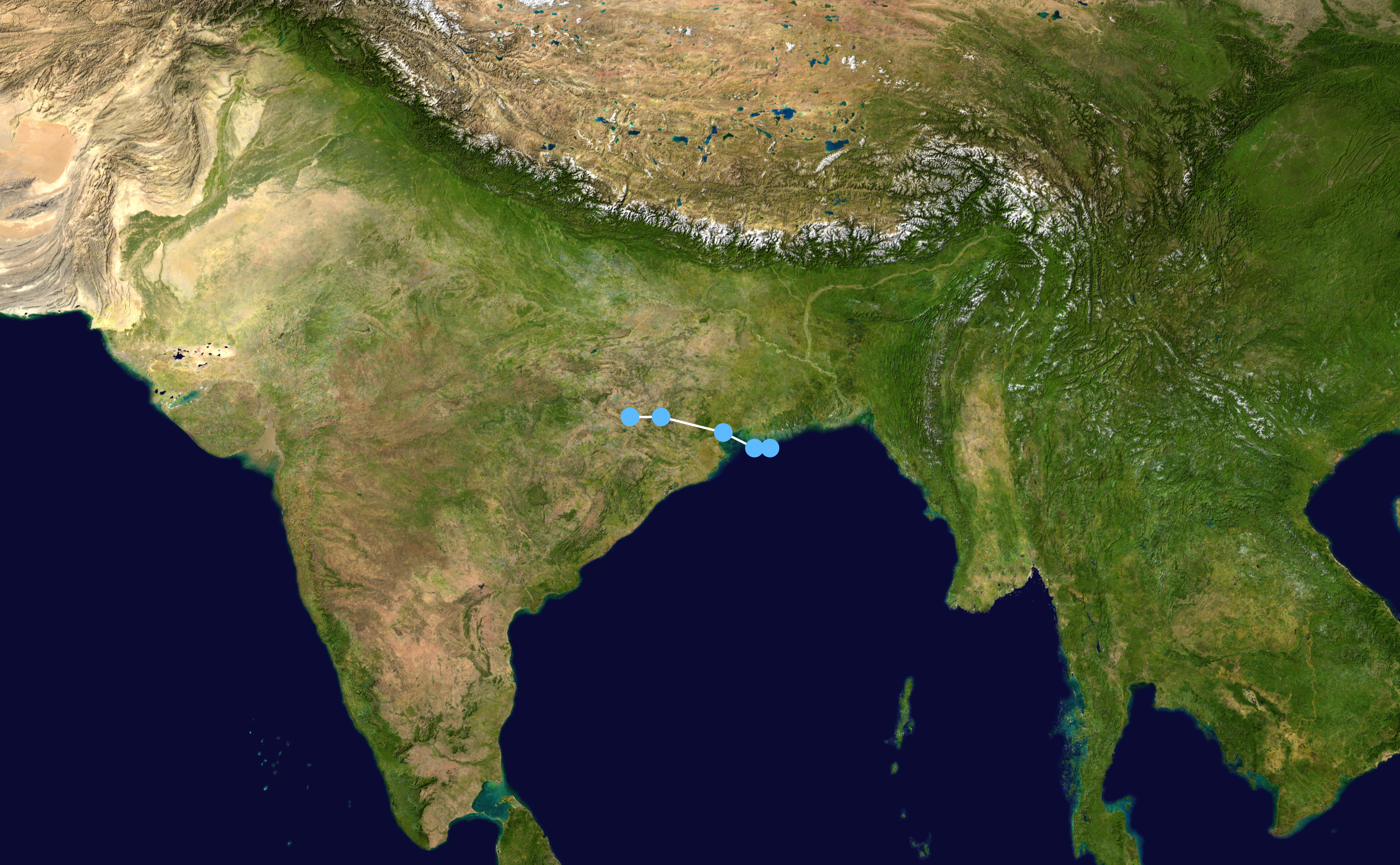
- Duration: July 20 – July 21
- Peak intensity: 55 km/h (35 mph) (3-min); 988 hPa (mbar)

Early on July 20, RSMC New Delhi reported that Depression BOB 03 had formed about 120 km (75 miles) to the southeast of Digha. Convection had been gradually organizing itself over the last 12 hours, and was in an area of low to moderate vertical wind shear. The Depression then intensified further and became a Deep Depression that afternoon before making landfall crossed north Orissa-West Bengal coast between Balasore and Digha during 1600 and 1700 UTC later that day. The Deep Depression gradually weakened before becoming a low-pressure area early the next day. Binika in Orissa received 220 mm rainfall on 21 July. Around 43 people lost their lives in the state of Orissa.

The remnants of this storm caused heavy to very heavy downpours in coastal Pakistan.

=== Deep Depression BOB 04 ===
- Deep depression (IMD)
- Tropical storm (SSHWS)
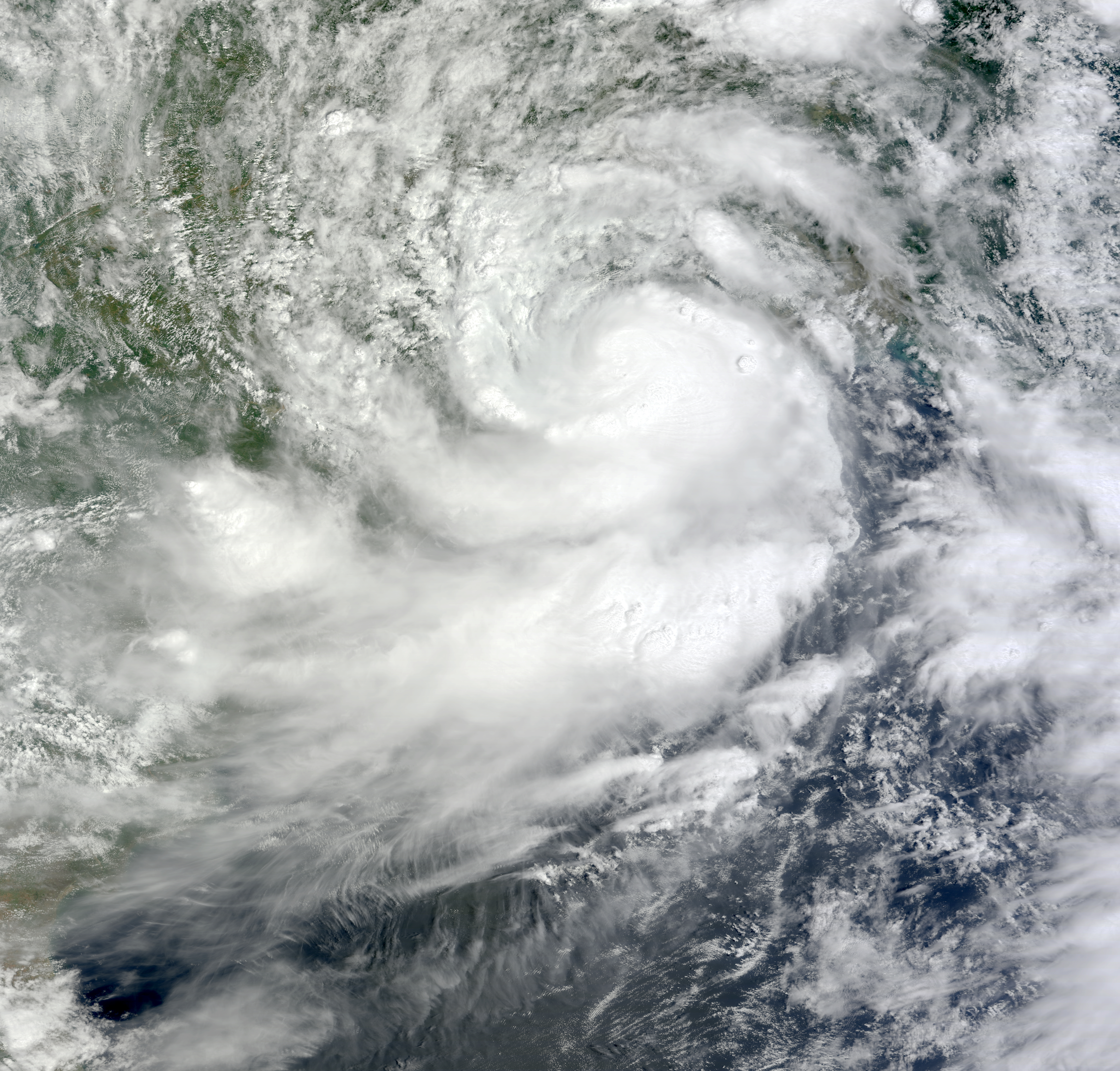
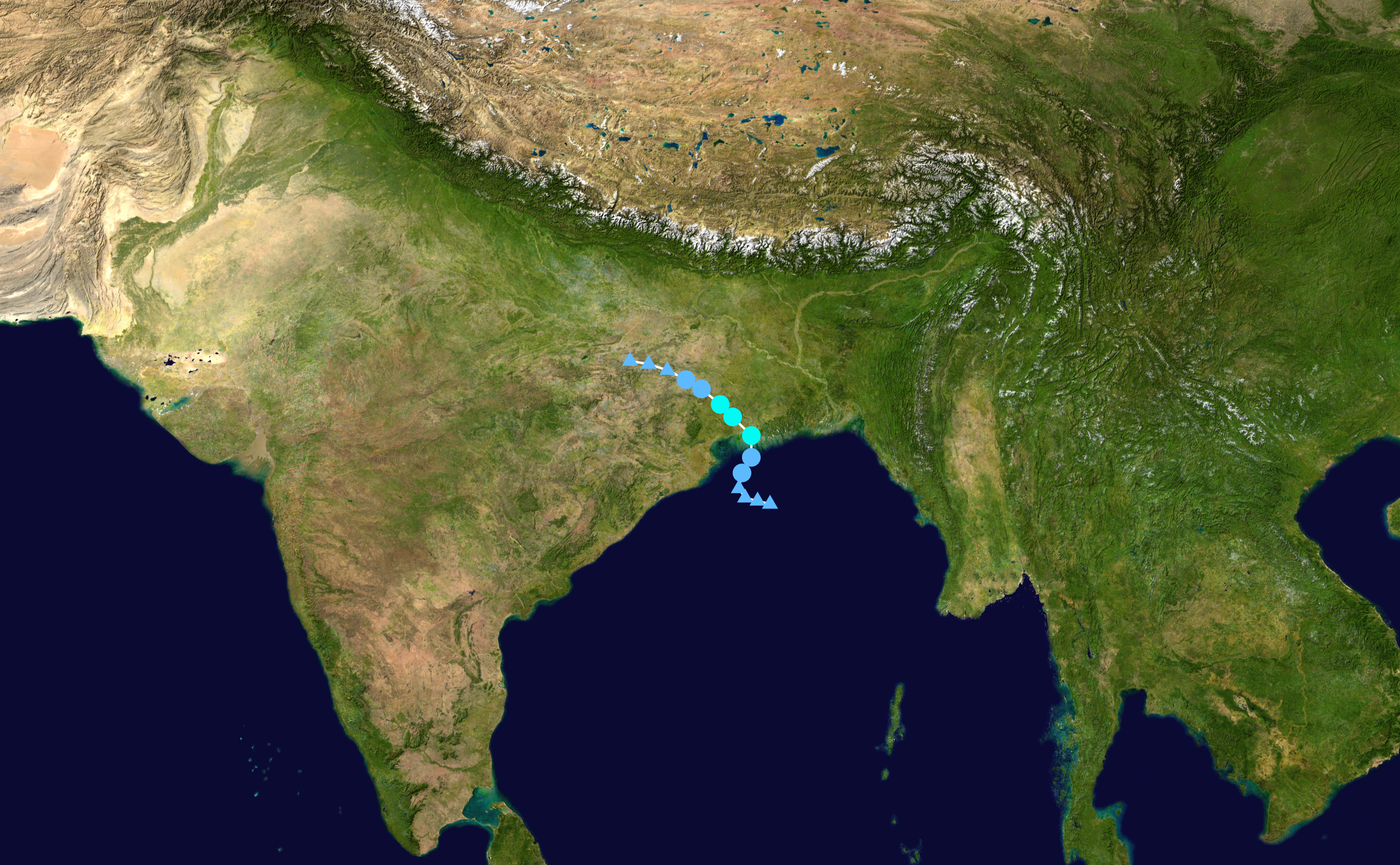
- Duration: September 4 – September 7
- Peak intensity: 55 km/h (35 mph) (3-min); 988 hPa (mbar)

Early on September 3, the IMD reported that an area of low pressure had formed embedded within the monsoon off the Orissa coastline. During the next day it developed further with the IMD reporting that the low-pressure area had become well marked with deep convection starting to consolidate around a developing low level circulation center in an area of moderate vertical wind shear. Early on September 5, as the area of low pressure was moving into an area of low vertical windshear the JTWC issued a Tropical Cyclone Formation Alert, whilst the IMD reported that the low-pressure area had intensified into a Depression. Later that day the IMD reported that the depression had intensified further and had become a Deep Depression, whilst the JTWC designated the depression as a Cyclone 03B, with winds equivalent to a tropical storm. However the JTWC's first warning was also their final warning as the cyclone had made landfall near Digha in West Bengal and was expected to dissipate later that day. However the IMD kept issuing advisories on the deep depression until early on September 7, when the IMD reported that it had weakened into a depression and then into a well marked low-pressure area later that day when they stopped issuing advisories on the depression whilst it was located over Jharkhand and adjoining region of Chhattisgarh.

One person drowned in Digha after being swept away by high waters. Berhampur received 210 mm of rainfall on 6 September.

=== Cyclonic Storm Phyan ===
- Cyclonic storm (IMD)
- Tropical storm (SSHWS)
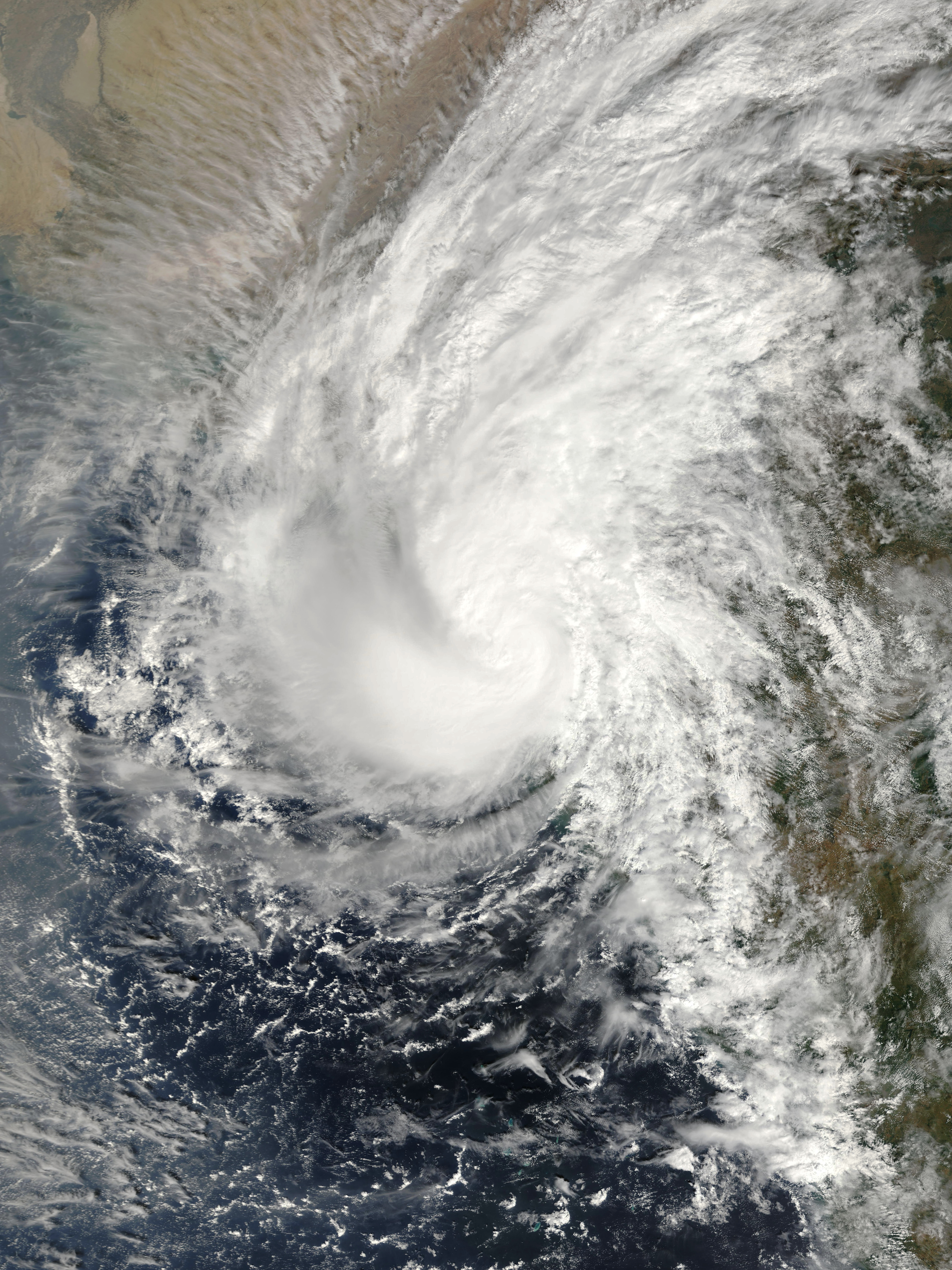
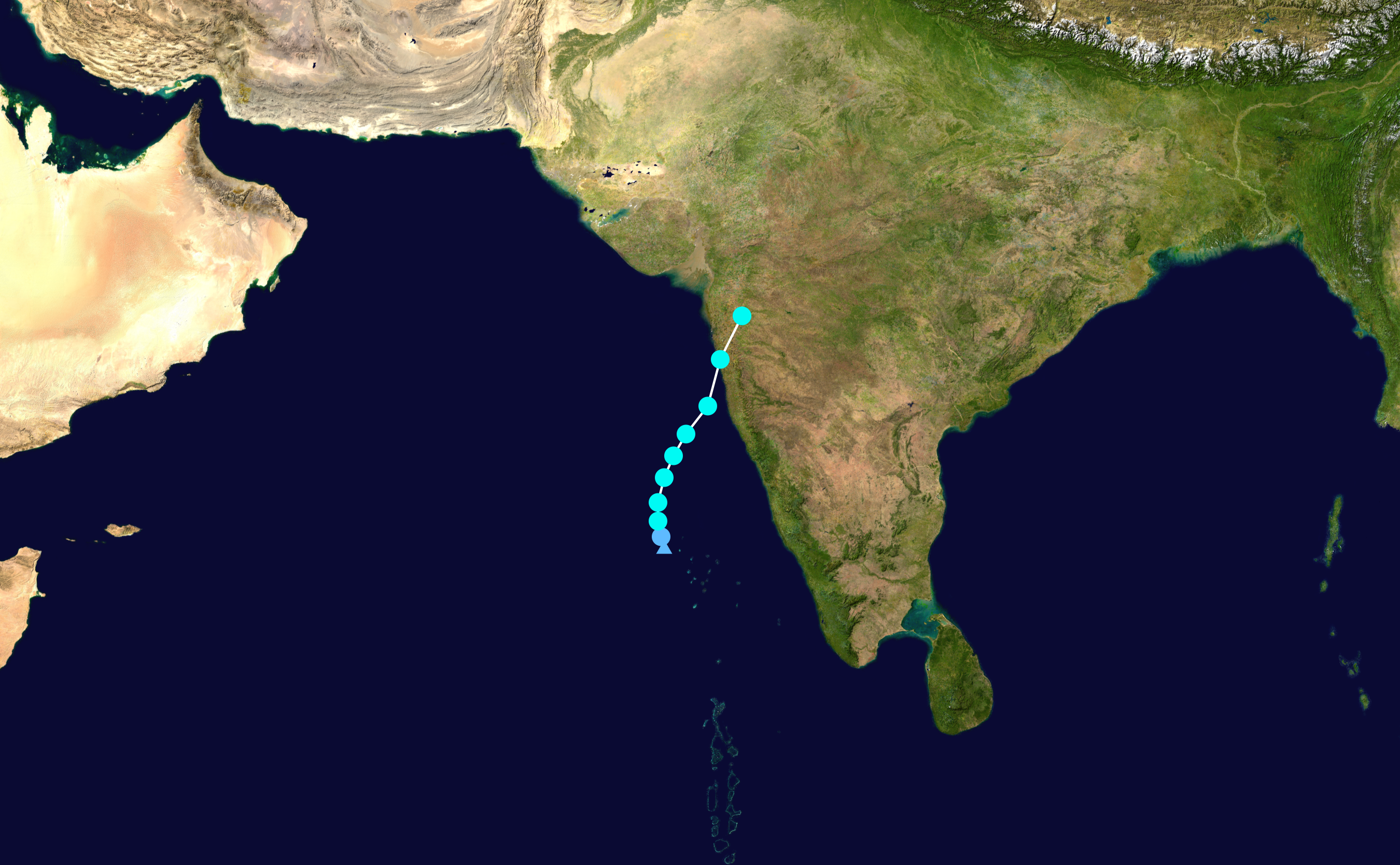
- Duration: November 4 – November 11
- Peak intensity: 85 km/h (50 mph) (3-min); 988 hPa (mbar)

Cyclonic Storm Phyan developed as a tropical disturbance to the southwest of Colombo in Sri Lanka late on November 4. Over the next couple of days the disturbance gradually developed before weakening as it made landfall on Southern India on November 7. After the disturbance had emerged into the Arabian Sea late on November 8 it rapidly became more marked with the India Meteorological Department (IMD) reporting early on November 9 that the disturbance had intensified into a Depression and designated it as Depression ARB 03 whilst the Joint Typhoon Warning Center (JTWC) issued a Tropical Cyclone Formation Alert. Later that day the JTWC designated the system as Cyclone 04A. During the next day as the Depression turned towards the northeast, the IMD reported that it had intensified into a Cyclonic Storm and named it Phyan. (Note: The name Phyan (Burmese: ဖျံ, [pʰjàɴ]) was contributed by Myanmar and refers to the smooth-coated otter (Lutrogale perspicillata) in Burmese.) Chandwad in Maharashtra recorded 240 mm of rainfall in 48 hours between 11 and 12 November. The maximum winds of 68 km/h were reported in Pune at the time of landfall. However the coastal areas recorded 75 km/h winds. Seven persons died and about 44 fishermen were missing due to the cyclone.

As a tropical disturbance, Phyan caused heavy rainfall in Tamil Nadu. Kethi in Nilgiris district of Tamil Nadu received 82 cm of rainfall in 24 hours, beating the previous 24-hour rainfall record for Tamil Nadu. Kethi recorded 1171 mm of rainfall in 72 hours, making Phyan the 5th wettest cyclone in India.

=== Cyclonic Storm Ward ===
- Cyclonic storm (IMD)
- Tropical storm (SSHWS)
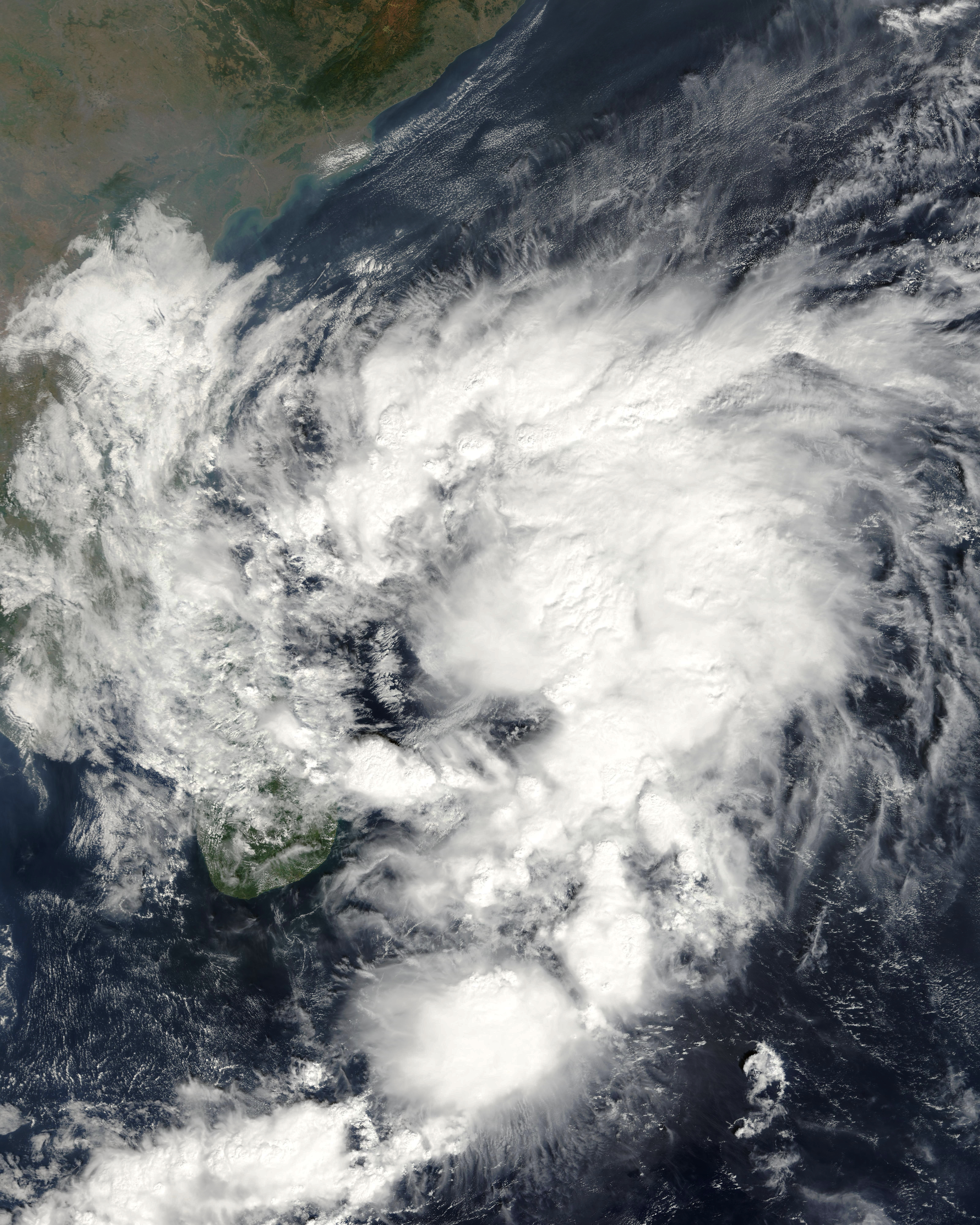
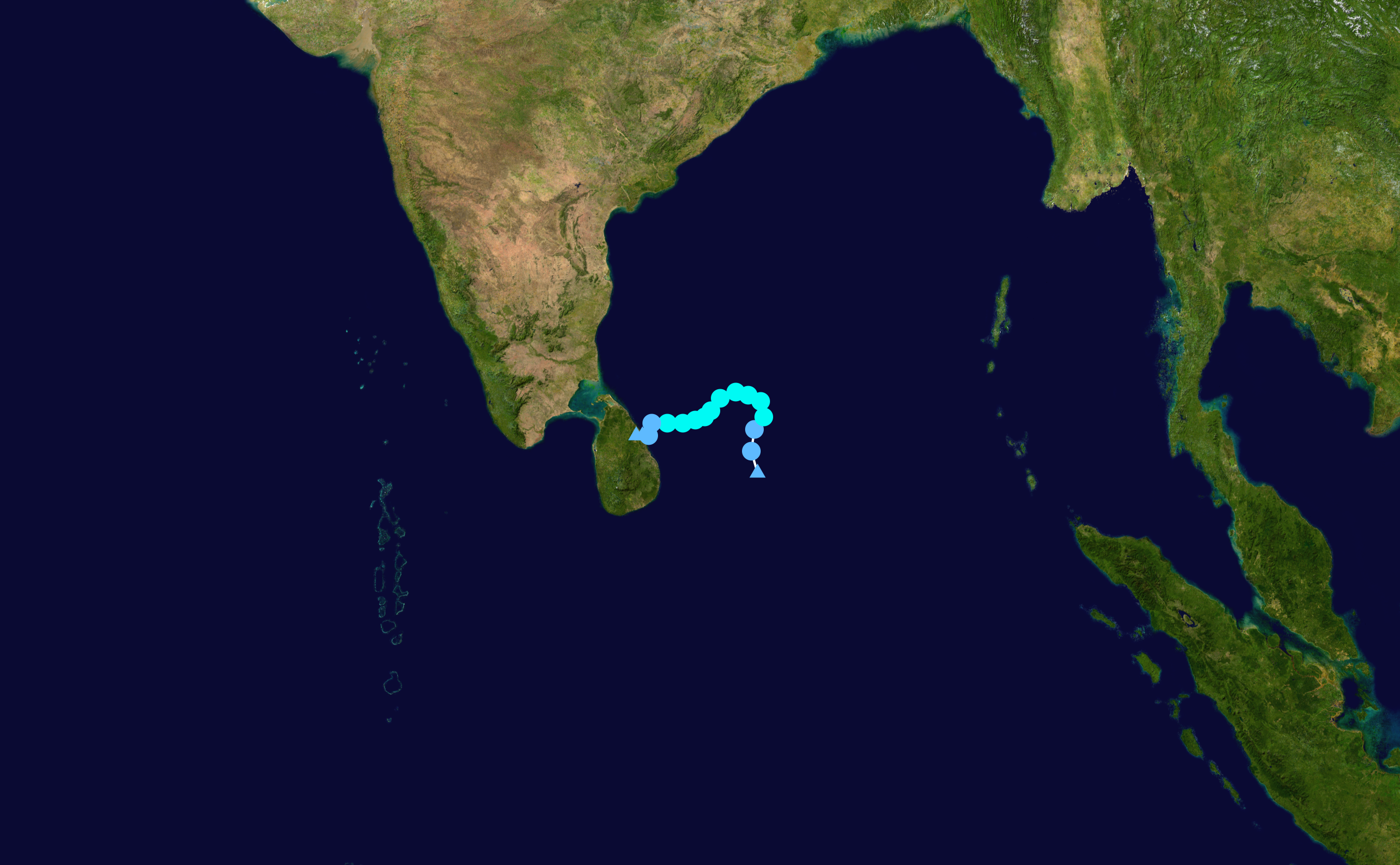
- Duration: December 10 – December 16
- Peak intensity: 85 km/h (50 mph) (3-min); 996 hPa (mbar)

On December 10, RSMC New Delhi announced that Depression BOB 05 had formed, about 400 km east-southeast of Batticaloa, Sri Lanka. The next day it strengthened to become Cyclonic Storm Ward. (Note: The name Ward (Arabic: ورد, [ward]) was contributed by Oman and means "roses" in Arabic.) After wandering some time to the east of Sri Lanka, the system made landfall near Trincomalee on December 14 as a Deep Depression. Cyclonic Storm Ward dissipated completely on December 16. Sirkali in Tamil Nadu recorded 140 mm of rainfall on 15 December. Maximum winds of 25 knots (46 km/h) was reported at the Pamban observatory in coastal Tamil Nadu.

== Season effects ==
This is a table of the storms in 2009 and their landfall(s), if any; the table does not include storms that did not make landfall, which is defined as the center of the storm moving over a landmass. Deaths in parentheses are additional and indirect (an example of an indirect death would be a traffic accident), but are still storm-related. Damage and deaths include totals while the storm was extratropical or a wave or low.

Name	Dates	Peak intensity			Areas affected	Damage (USD)	Deaths	Ref(s).
Name	Dates	Category	Wind speed	Pressure	Areas affected	Damage (USD)	Deaths	Ref(s).
Bijli	April 14–17	Cyclonic storm	75 km/h (45 mph)	996 hPa (29.41 inHg)	Eastern India, Bangladesh, Myanmar	None	7	
Aila	May 23–26	Severe cyclonic storm	110 km/h (70 mph)	968 hPa (28.59 inHg)	India, Bangladesh	$1.83 billion	339	
ARB 01	June 23–24	Depression	45 km/h (30 mph)	998 hPa (29.47 inHg)	India	None	9	
ARB 02	June 25–26	Depression	45 km/h (30 mph)	998 hPa (29.47 inHg)	India	None	None	
BOB 03	July 20–21	Deep depression	55 km/h (35 mph)	988 hPa (29.18 inHg)	India	None	43	
BOB 04	September 5–7	Deep depression	55 km/h (35 mph)	990 hPa (29.23 inHg)	India (West Bengal)	None	1	
Phyan	November 9–12	Cyclonic storm	85 km/h (55 mph)	988 hPa (29.18 inHg)	India	$300 million	20	
Ward	December 10–16	Cyclonic storm	85 km/h (55 mph)	996 hPa (29.41 inHg)	Sri Lanka, India	Minimal	Unknown	
Season aggregates
8 systems	April 14 – December 16		110 km/h (70 mph)	968 hPa (28.59 inHg)		>$1.3 billion	419	

== See also ==
- North Indian Ocean tropical cyclone
- Tropical cyclones in 2009
- 2009 Atlantic hurricane season
- 2009 Pacific hurricane season
- 2009 Pacific typhoon season
- South-West Indian Ocean cyclone seasons: 2008–09, 2009–10
- Australian region cyclone seasons: 2008–09, 2009–10
- South Pacific cyclone seasons: 2008–09, 2009–10
