= Cyclone Laurence =

Category 5 Australian cyclone in 2009

Severe Tropical Cyclone Laurence
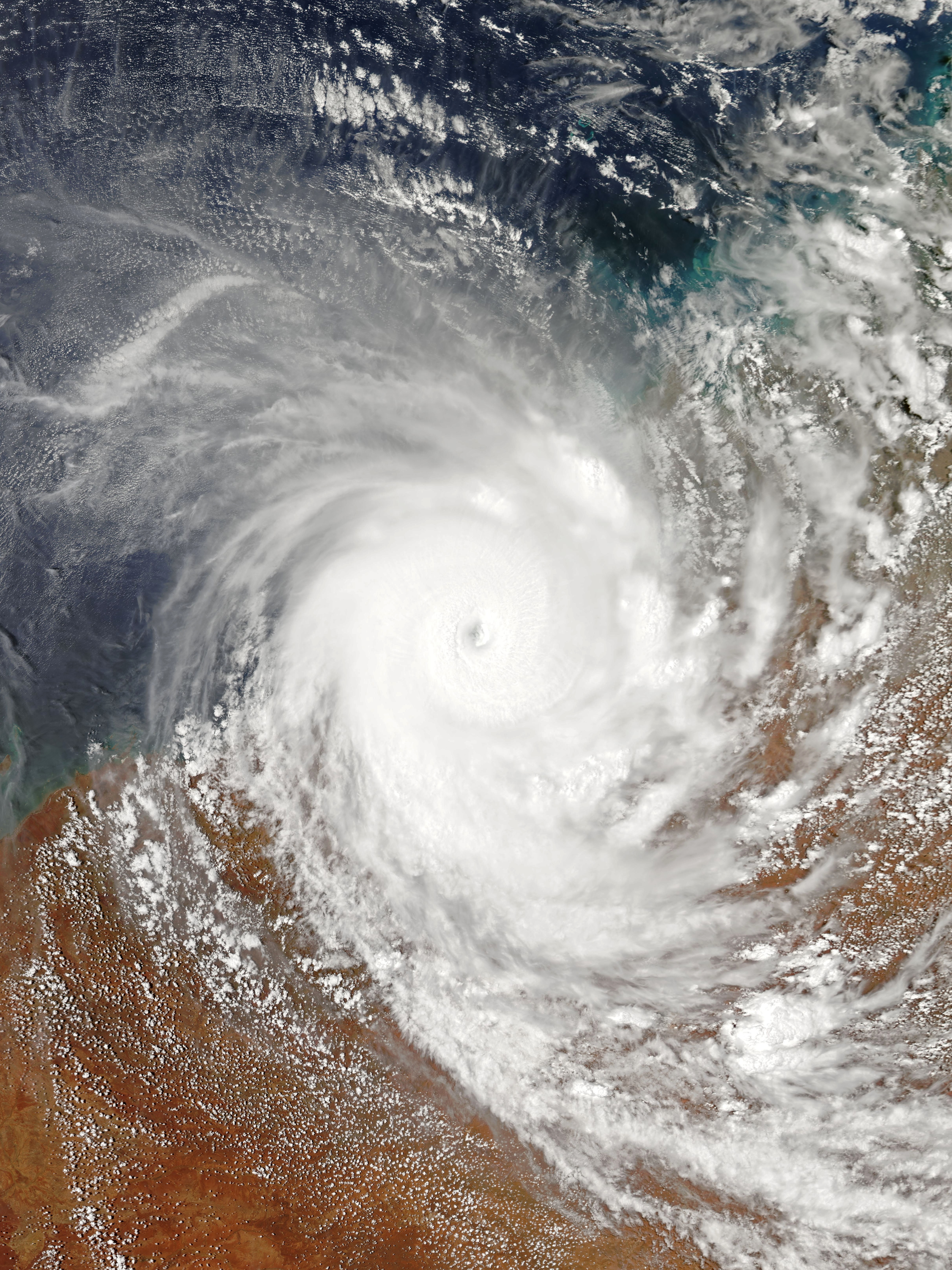
- Cyclone Laurence at peak intensity on 21 December

Meteorological history
- Formed: 8 December 2009
- Dissipated: 23 December 2009

Category 5 severe tropical cyclone
- 10-minute sustained (BOM)
- Highest winds: 205 km/h (125 mph)
- Lowest pressure: 925 hPa (mbar); 27.32 inHg

Category 4-equivalent tropical cyclone
- 1-minute sustained (SSHWS/JTWC)
- Highest winds: 240 km/h (150 mph)
- Lowest pressure: 926 hPa (mbar); 27.34 inHg

Overall effects
- Fatalities: None
- Damage: $9 million (2009 USD)
- Areas affected: Northern Territory, South Australia and Western Australia
- IBTrACS
- Part of the 2009–10 Australian region cyclone season

Severe Tropical Cyclone Laurence of December 2009 was the first Category 5 tropical cyclone to make landfall in Australia since Cyclone George in 2007. Laurence was the first named system, and first system overall to form during the 2009–10 Australian region cyclone season.

== Meteorological history ==
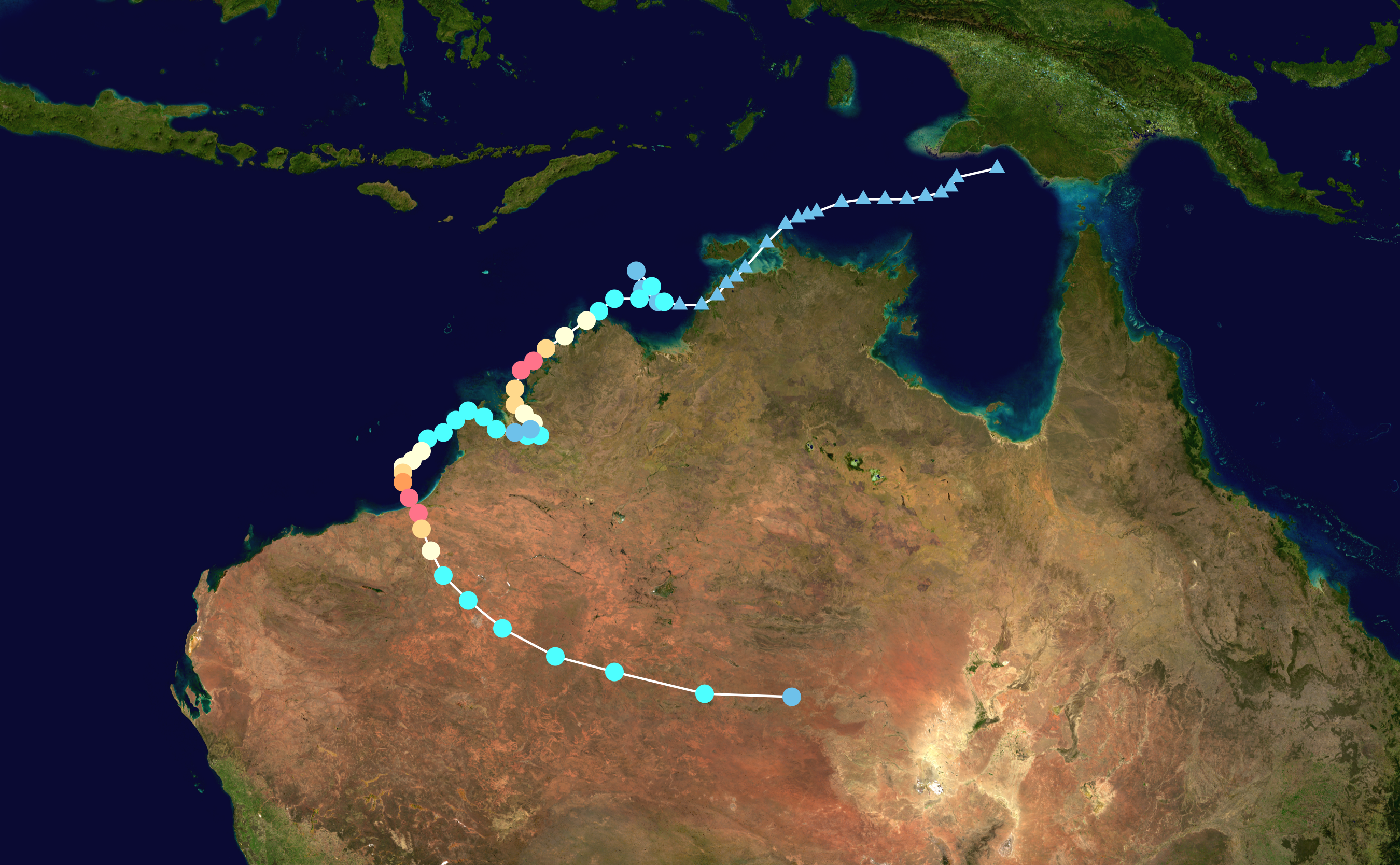
Map plotting the storm's track and intensity, according to the Saffir–Simpson scale Map key Saffir–Simpson scale Tropical depression (≤38 mph, ≤62 km/h) Tropical storm (39–73 mph, 63–118 km/h) Category 1 (74–95 mph, 119–153 km/h) Category 2 (96–110 mph, 154–177 km/h) Category 3 (111–129 mph, 178–208 km/h) Category 4 (130–156 mph, 209–251 km/h) Category 5 (≥157 mph, ≥252 km/h) Unknown Storm type Tropical cyclone Subtropical cyclone Extratropical cyclone, remnant low, tropical disturbance, or monsoon depression

Severe Tropical Cyclone Laurence was first identified by the Bureau of Meteorology (BoM) on 8 December 2009 over the Arafura Sea. As the system moved west north of the Top End on 10 December, TCWC Darwin issued a Tropical Cyclone Watch for coastal areas from Croker Island to Bathurst Island but excluding Darwin. Later that day, TCWC Perth cancelled all previous warnings and issued new watches for Kalumburu, south to Wyndham and west to Mitchell Plateau. The system hovered in the same general region for a day, before strengthening into a category one cyclone, and was named by the TCWC Darwin as Tropical Cyclone Laurence. During the morning of 15 December, the cyclone strengthened into a category 2 cyclone before strengthening further into a category 3 system. In the early hours of 16 December Severe TC Laurence was upgraded to a strong category 4 with an eye starting to develop; later developing into a category 5 system. The cyclone crossed the Kimberley coast southeast of Cockatoo Island on 16 December and Derby was in the projected path.

On 17 December the cyclone weakened as it meandered over land dumping heavy rain over northern Kimberley. The cyclone's track during the day veered south-west and re-intensification was likely by 18 December as it moved over warm waters. On 19 December, the storm re-intensified into a category one cyclone and began moving slowly southwest, and further intensified into a category 2 the same day. On 20 December it intensified into a category 3 severe tropical cyclone, and showed signs of further intensification. On 21 December, the cyclone rapidly intensified into a category 4, and then 5 by the afternoon. The cyclone made landfall on the Western Australia coast near Eighty Mile Beach as a category 5 storm with significant damage to structures reported, although no injuries have been reported. Telephone services to the affected area were disrupted. Overnight, the system began moving inland and rapidly picking up speed, while gradually weakening into a category 3 tropical cyclone. By early 23 December, the cyclone had weakened to Category 1 intensity, but not before inundating eastern Pilbara region with rain and flash flooding. Laurence accelerated even further, and was expected to cause gale-force winds and flooding rain as far as South Australia.

== Preparations and impact ==
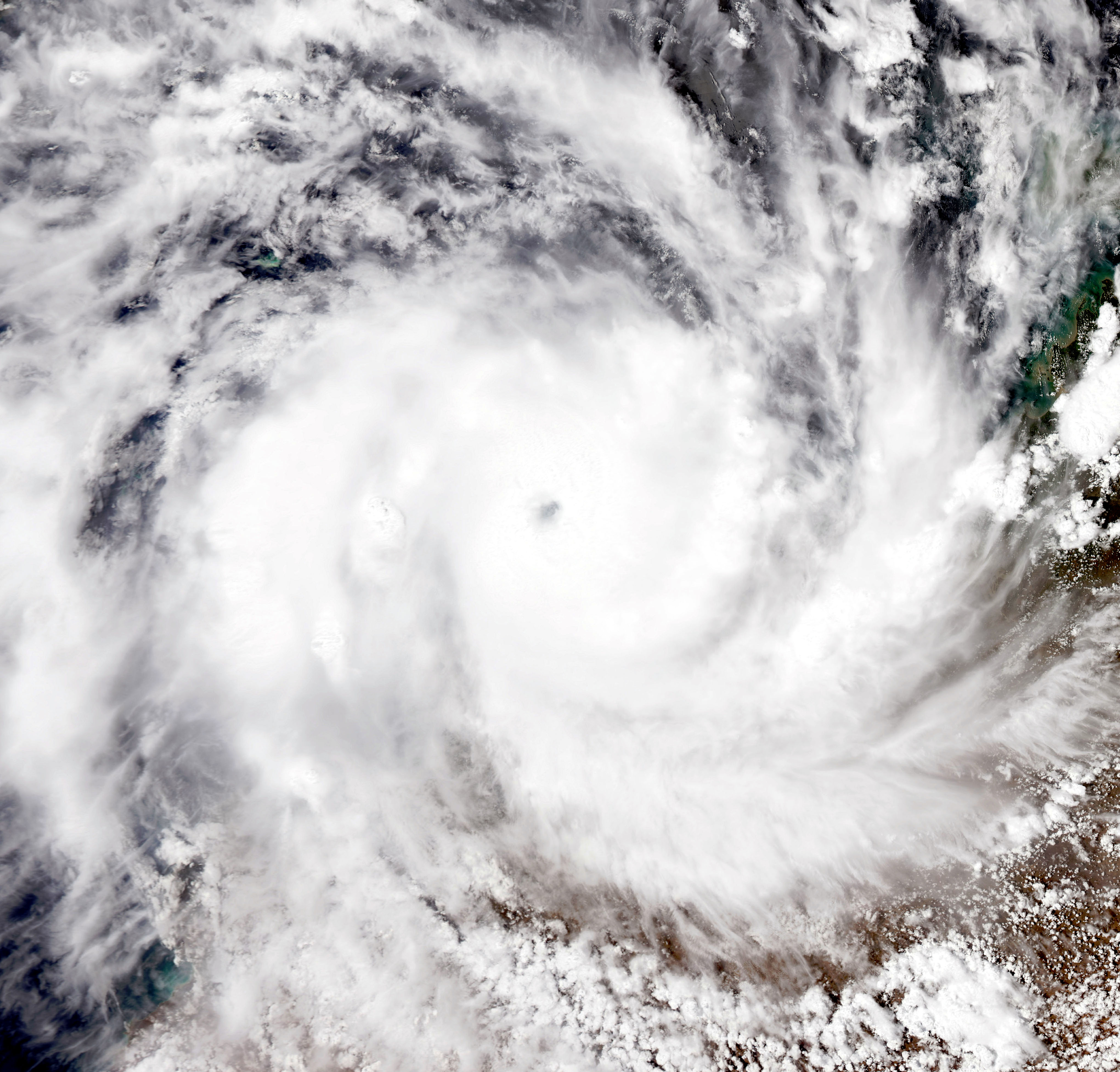
Cyclone Laurence near Kimberly on 15 December

As a tropical low, the precursor to Laurence produced 250 mm (9.8 in) of rain in Darwin, Northern Territory in a 24-hour span. One person was seriously injured after falling off a roof in the Kimberley, Western Australia.

After making its final landfall along the Pilbara coastline as a Category 5 cyclone, Laurence wrought severe damage. Numerous trees were uprooted by wind gusts reaching 295 km/h (183 mph) and several homes sustained substantial damage. Rainfall in the region was estimated to have exceeded 250 mm (9.8 in). Power and phone service to most of the Pilbara was lost during the storm and several residents sought shelter in public buildings. Although no people were killed by the storm, hundreds of livestock were feared to have been killed in the affected region.

Heavy rain and gale-force winds associated with the cyclone forced the closure of Newcrest's Telfer gold mine for a day as all non-essential workers were flown from the site.

New South Wales' river systems were put on flood alert as rain fell widely. Systems affected were:

- Castlereagh River,
- Bogan River,
- Lower Namoi River, and
- Lower Macquarie Rivers, and
- the Barwon River and associated Darling River between Walgett and Bourke.

The name Laurence was retired. It was replaced with Lincoln.

Damage from the storm amounted to A$10 million (US$9 million).

== See also ==
- 2009–10 Australian region cyclone season
- Cyclone Lua (2012)
- Cyclone Rusty (2013)
- Cyclone Ilsa (2023)
