= 2009–10 Australian region cyclone season =

Tropical cyclone season

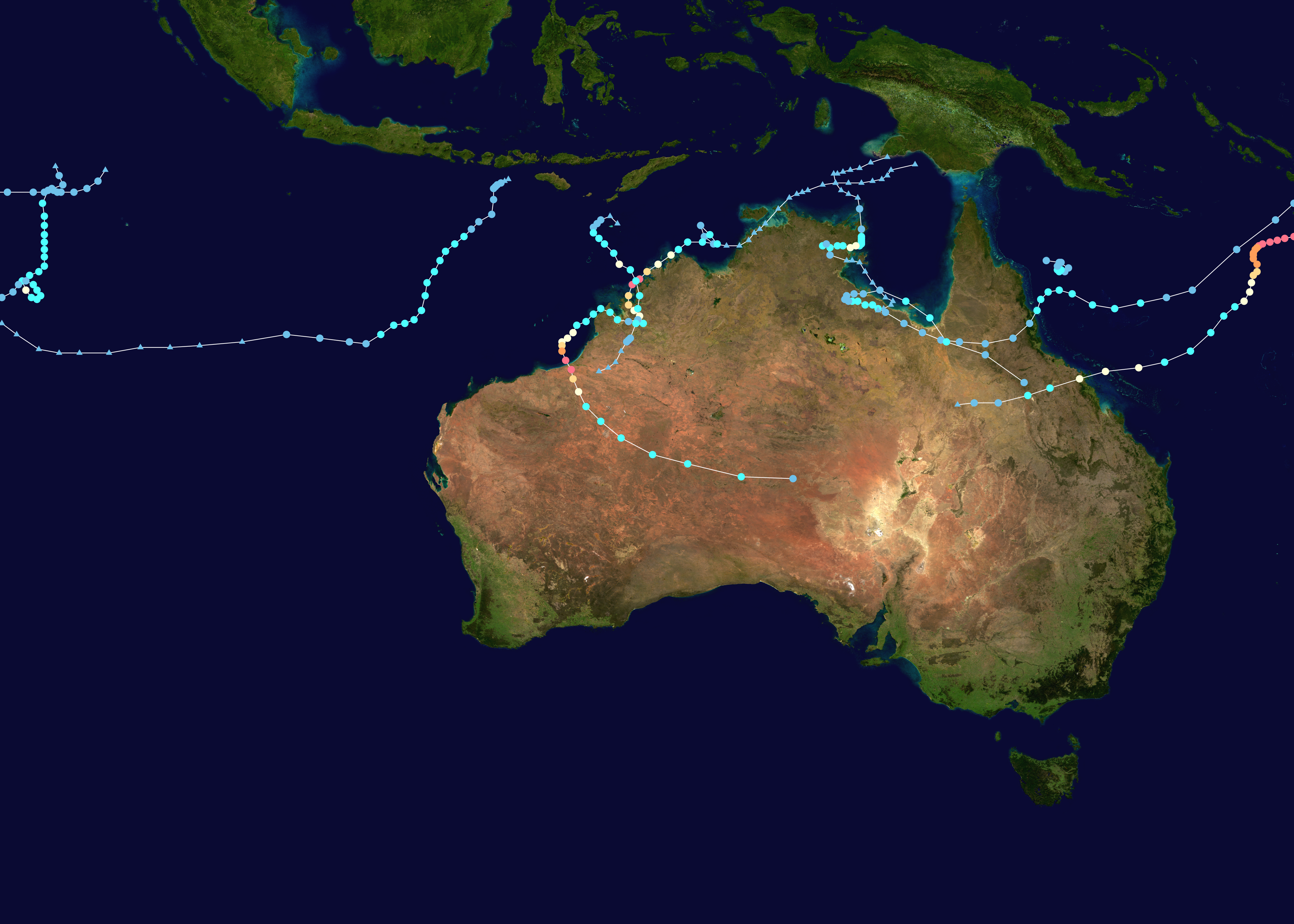
- Season summary map

Seasonal boundaries
- First system formed: 8 December 2009
- Last system dissipated: 25 April 2010

Strongest storm
- Name: Laurence
  - Maximum winds: 205 km/h (125 mph) (10-minute sustained)
  - Lowest pressure: 925 hPa (mbar)

Seasonal statistics
- Tropical lows: 13
- Tropical cyclones: 8
- Severe tropical cyclones: 4
- Total fatalities: 3 total
- Total damage: $681 million (2010 USD)

Related articles
- Timeline of the 2009–10 Australian region cyclone season; 2009–10 South-West Indian Ocean cyclone season; 2009–10 South Pacific cyclone season

The 2009–10 Australian region cyclone season was a below average tropical cyclone season, with eight tropical cyclones forming compared to an average of 12. The season began on 1 November 2009 and ran through until it end on 30 April 2010. The Australian region is defined as being to south of the equator, between the 90th meridian east and 160th meridian east. Tropical cyclones in this area are monitored by five Tropical Cyclone Warning Centres (TCWC's): Jakarta, Port Moresby, Perth, Darwin and Brisbane. Each of which have the power to name a tropical cyclone. The TCWC's in Perth, Darwin and Brisbane are run by the Bureau of Meteorology, who designate significant tropical lows with a number and the U suffix. The Joint Typhoon Warning Center also issues unofficial warnings for the region, designating significant tropical cyclones with the "S" suffix when they form west of 135°E, and the "P" suffix when they form east of 135°E.

Torrential rains produced by Tropical Cyclones Olga and Paul resulted in widespread flooding and damage in northern Australia. The combined losses from these storms reached A$508 million (US$500 million).

== Seasonal forecasts ==
TSR forecasts Date	Tropical storms	Severe Tropical cyclones	Landfalling cyclones	ACE	Ref
Average (1975/76–2008/09)	10.6	5.6	4.5	80	
7 May 2009	9.8	5.3	4.3	–	
6 July 2009	8.2	4.4	3.7	–	
4 September 2009	8.2	4.4	3.7	75	
6 November 2009	7.9	4.2	3.6	–	
4 December 2009	7.3	3.9	3.6	60	
Region		Average	Predicted activity	Actual activity	Ref
Whole		12	7–13	8	
Western		7	5–8	4	
Northern		4	3–4	3	
Eastern		4	3–4	3	
	Forecast Center	Tropical lows	Tropical cyclones	Severe tropical cyclones	Ref
Actual activity:	BoM	13	8	4	
Actual activity:	JTWC	10	7	5	

=== Bureau of Meteorology ===
For the first time this season, the Bureau of Meteorology's National Climate Center (NCC), issued a seasonal forecast for the whole basin between 90°E and 160°E and included forecasts for TCWC Jakarta and Port Moresby's area of responsibility. The NCC issued four separate forecasts, one for the whole basin and three for the subregions Western Northern and Eastern with each one covering the whole tropical cyclone year. For the whole region the NCC forecast that 7–13 tropical cyclones would develop or move into the region, compared with an average of 12 tropical cyclones. For the Western region, which the NCC defined as being between 90°E and 125°E, they forecast that 5–8 tropical cyclones would develop or move into the region compared to an average of seven. For the Northern region which the NCC defined as being between 125°E and 142.5°E, they forecast that 3–4 tropical cyclones would develop and/or move through the region compared to an average of four. However they also noted that the model used for predicting cyclones in this area had a "low skill." For the Eastern region which the NCC defined as being between 142.5°E and 160°E, they reported that 3–4 tropical cyclones would also develop and/or move through the region compared to an average of four.

=== City University of Hong Kong ===
For the first time, the Guy Carpenter Asia-Pacific Climate Impact Centre (GCACIC), of the City University of Hong Kong (CityUHK), have issued a forecasts of tropical cyclone activity for the cyclone season. A forecast predicting how many tropical cyclones there will be within the Australian region as a whole and for the western part of the basin between 90°E and 135°E, was released in November. For this season, the GCACIC predicted that the region as a whole would see activity, near the average, predicting that 8 tropical cyclones will be in the region, with 5 of them within the western part of the region.

== Systems ==
=== Severe Tropical Cyclone Laurence ===
- Category 5 severe tropical cyclone (Australian scale)
- Category 4 tropical cyclone (SSHWS)
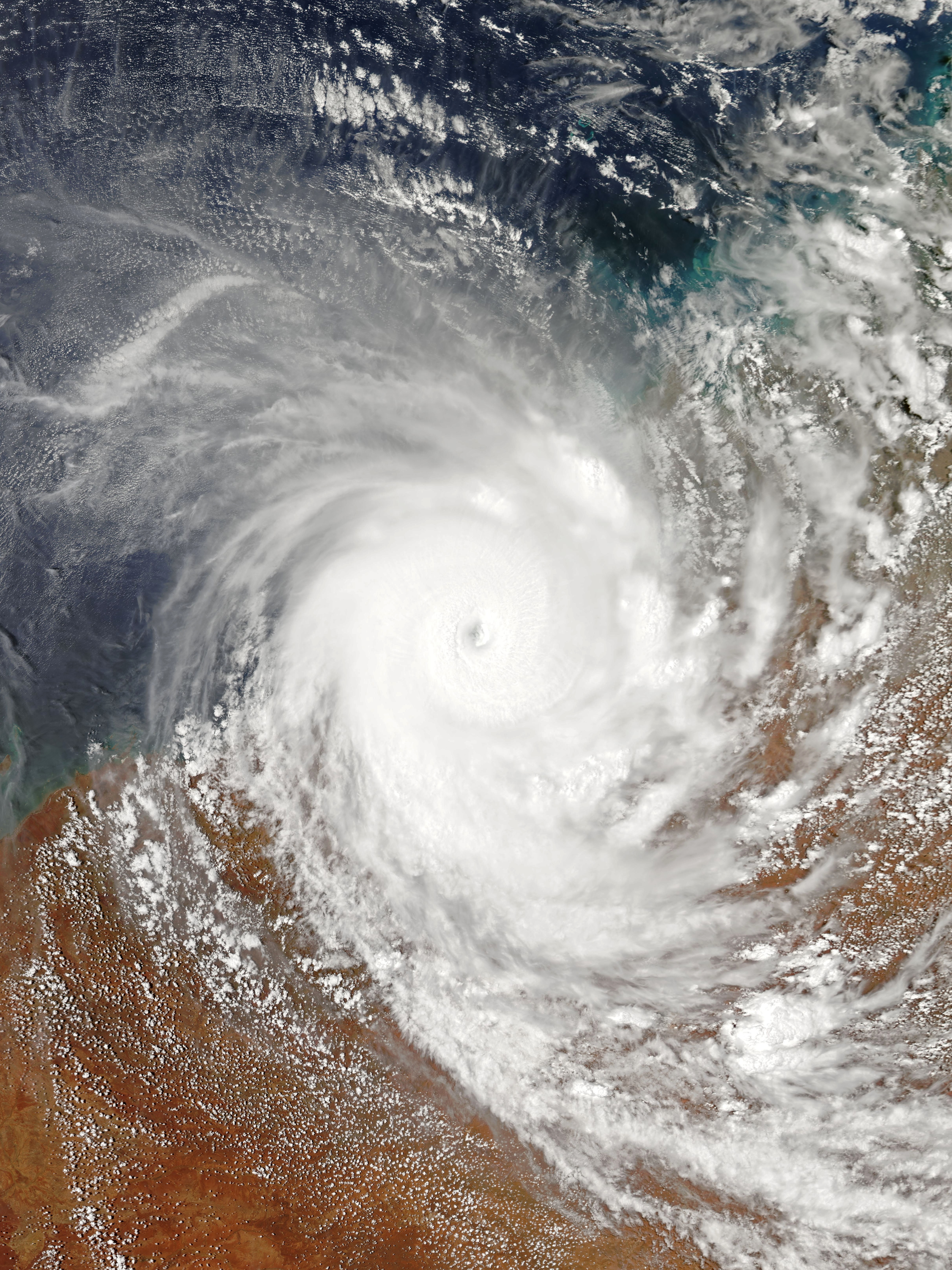
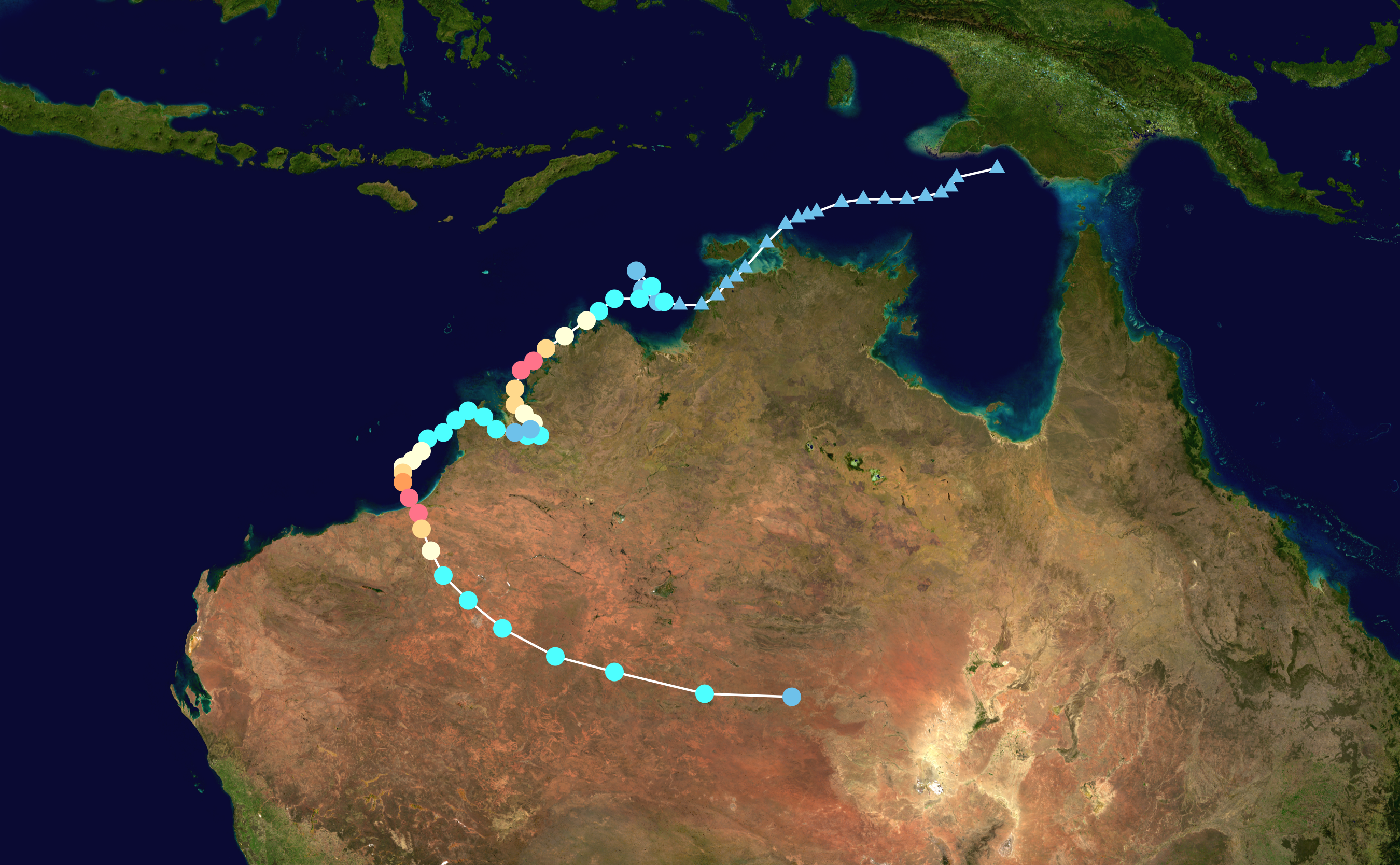
- Duration: 8 December – 23 December
- Peak intensity: 205 km/h (125 mph) (10-min); 925 hPa (mbar)

On 8 December, TCWC Darwin reported that a tropical low-pressure system had formed near the south coast of Papua New Guinea. As the system moved west north of the Top End on 10 December, TCWC Darwin issued a Tropical Cyclone Watch for coastal areas from Croker Island to Bathurst Island but excluding Darwin . Later that day, TCWC Perth cancelled all previous warnings and issued new watches for Kalumburu, south to Wyndham and west to Mitchell Plateau. The system hovered in the same general region for a day, before strengthening into a category one cyclone, and was named by the TCWC Darwin as Tropical Cyclone Laurence. During the morning of 15 December, the cyclone strengthened into a category 2 cyclone before strengthening further into a category 3 system. In the early hours of 16 December, Severe Tropical Cyclone Laurence was upgraded to a strong category 4 with an eye starting to develop; later developing into a category 5 system. The cyclone crossed the Kimberley coast southeast of Cockatoo Island on 16 December and passed near Derby. On 17 December the cyclone weakened as it meandered over land dumping heavy rain over northern Kimberley. The cyclone's track during the day veered south-west and re-intensification was likely by 18 December as it moved over warm waters. As predicted, Laurence restrengthened into a tropical cyclone after emerging over open waters. Later on 19 December, Laurence intensified further into a category 2 cyclone. On 20 December, Laurence intensified into a category 3 cyclone, and while continuing to turn to the south, it intensified to a category 4 cyclone on the morning of 21 December. Later that morning, Laurence further intensified into a category 5 cyclone, with Red Alerts issued for towns from Pardoo to Sandfire, and inland to Yarrie being advised to seek shelter immediately. Later that afternoon, Laurence made landfall as a severe category 5 cyclone, and was downgraded to a category 4 cyclone as it made landfall. There were reports of livestock deaths, flash flooding and damage to several homes caused by the cyclone, however, no loss of life was reported. On 22 December, Laurence was downgraded to a category 2 cyclone and then further downgraded to a category 1 cyclone later that day. On 23 December, Laurence was downgraded to a tropical low, as it continued to travel south. The cyclone's maximum wind gusts were reported to be 285 km/h.

=== Tropical Low 02U ===
- Tropical low (Australian scale)
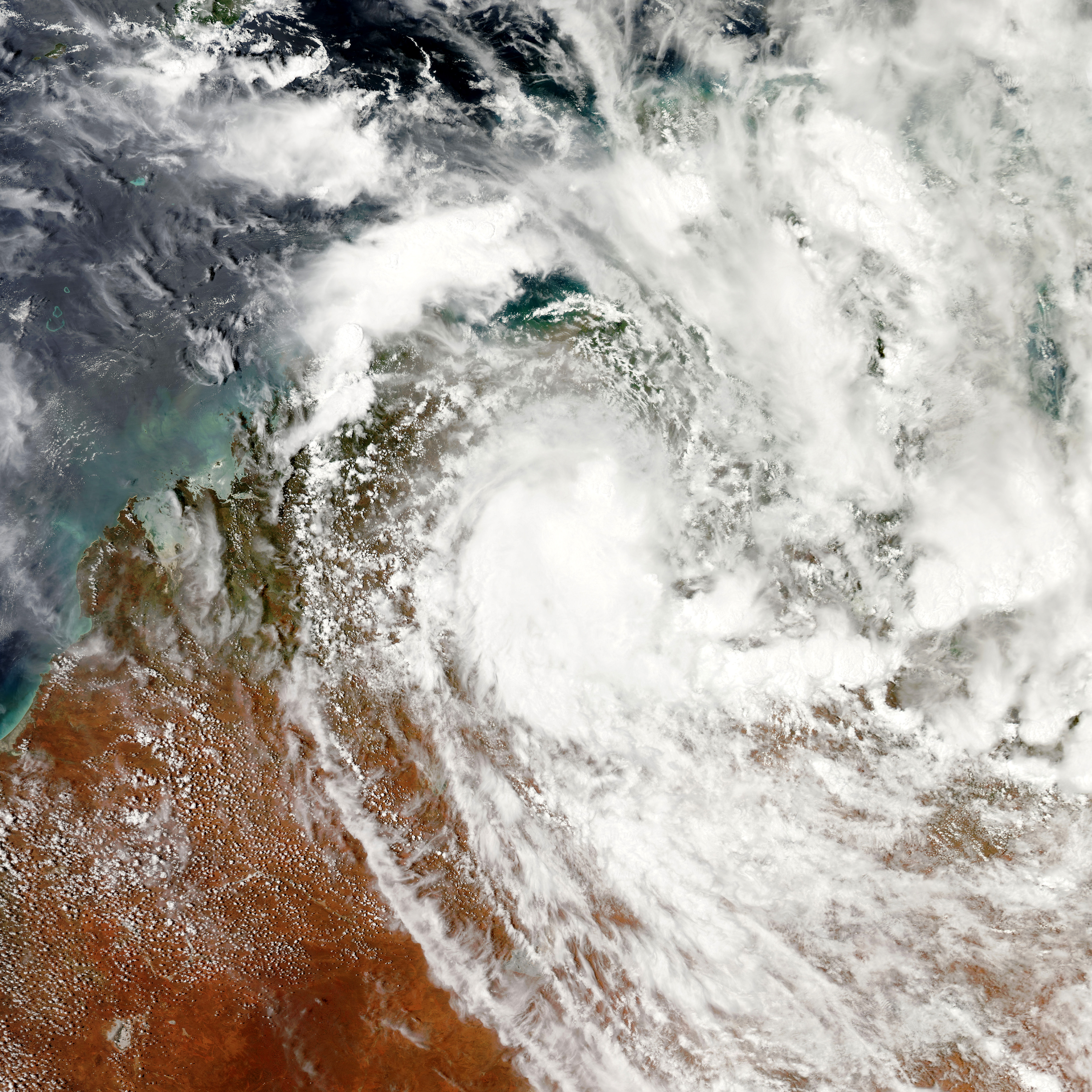
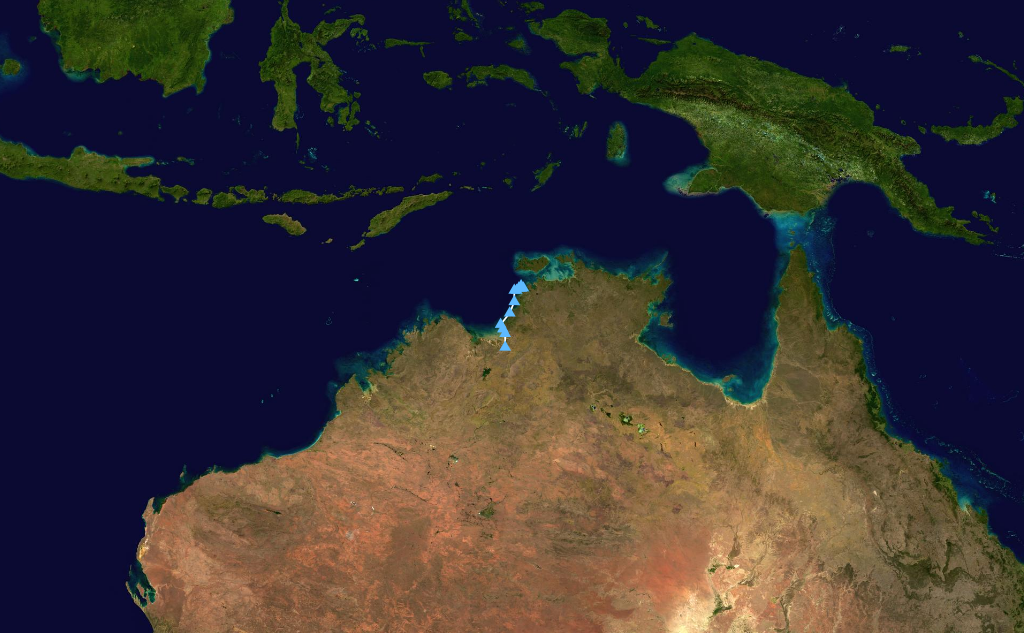
- Duration: 27 December – 6 January
- Peak intensity: 45 km/h (30 mph) (10-min); 991 hPa (mbar)

A Tropical Low formed just north of Australia on 27 December. Tropical Low 02U moved into the Timor Sea on 3 January and a Cyclone watch was declared for Kalumburu to Cape Don, including the capital of the Northern Territory, Darwin. On 4 January, the low strengthened in the Joseph Bonaparte Gulf. By 5 January the Tropical Low was located in the western Victoria River District and affecting the area with heavy rain and wind gusts of up to 90 kilometres per hour (56 mph).

=== Tropical Low 03U (Edzani) ===
- Tropical low (Australian scale)
- Tropical depression (SSHWS)
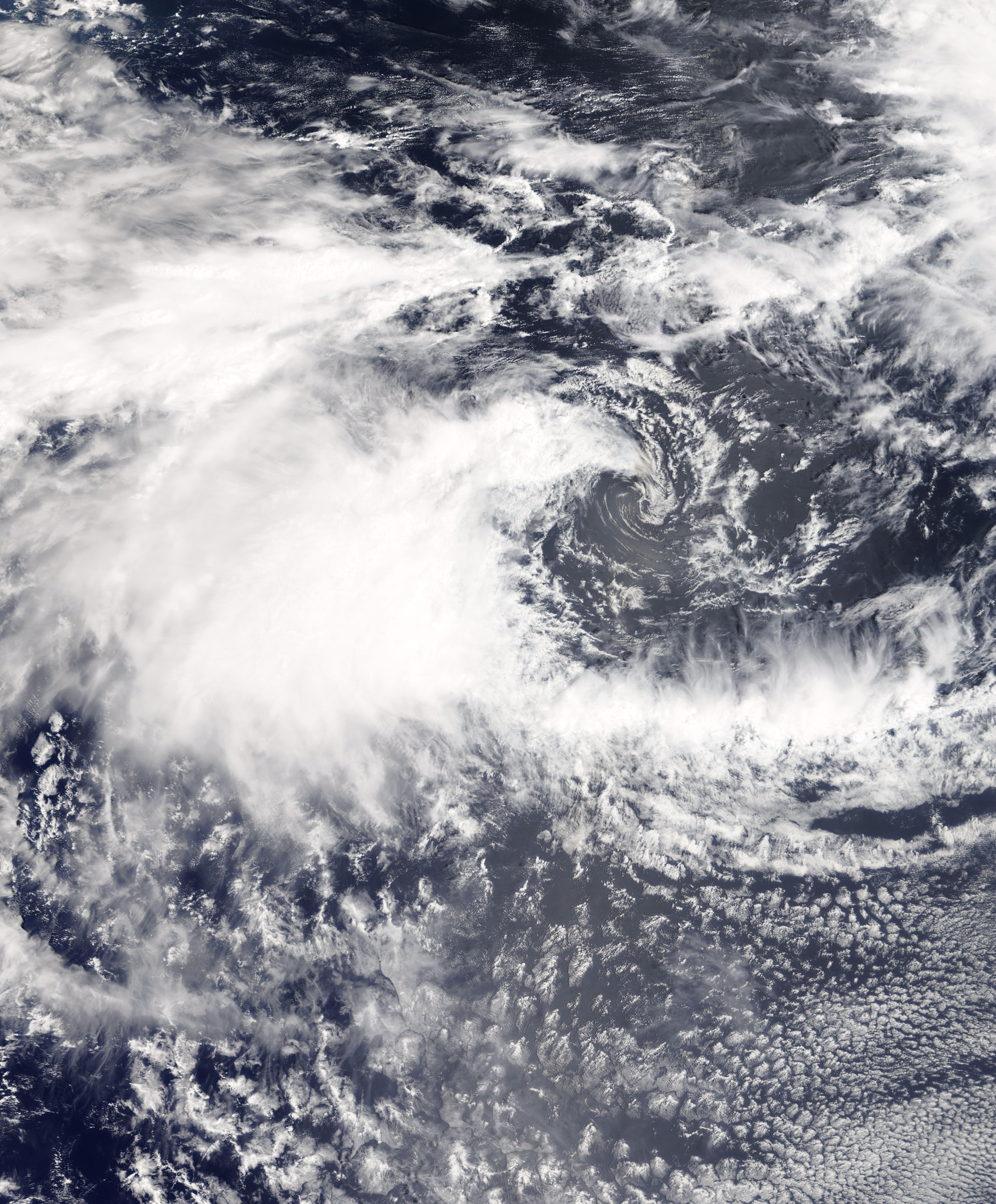
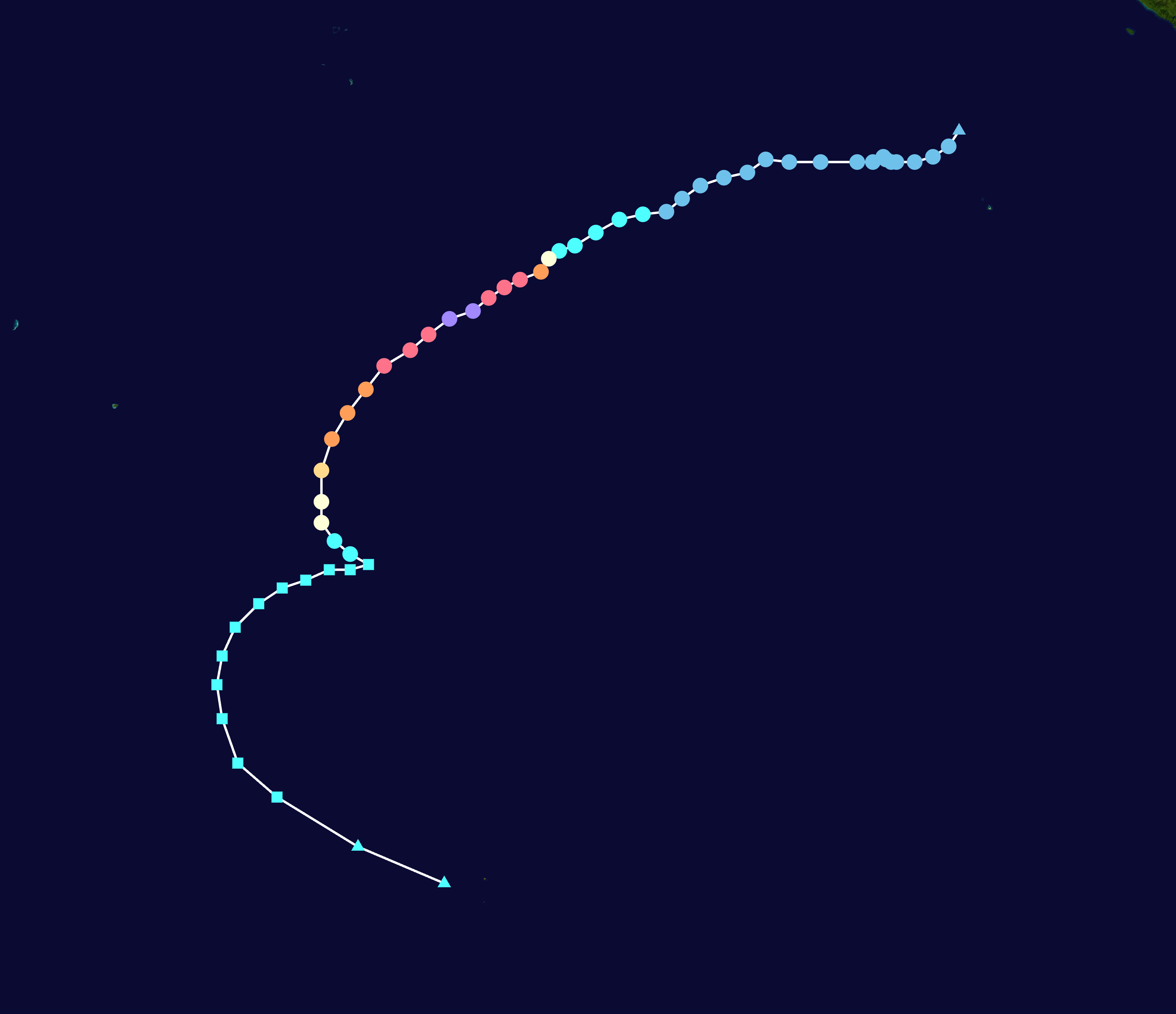
- Duration: 1 January – 4 January (Exited basin)
- Peak intensity: 55 km/h (35 mph) (10-min); 1000 hPa (mbar)

Tropical Low 03U developed near 9.6S, 94.4E, to the west of Indonesia and Malaysia, reported as 350 km northwest of the Cocos Islands. It was expected to intensify into a Tropical Cyclone within the next 48 hours, but did not reach Tropical Cyclone intensity. On 4 January, the tropical low moved west of 90E out of Australian area of responsibility, and it was later named Edzani by RSMC La Réunion and eventually strengthened into a very intense tropical cyclone.

=== Tropical Low 04U ===
- Tropical low (Australian scale)
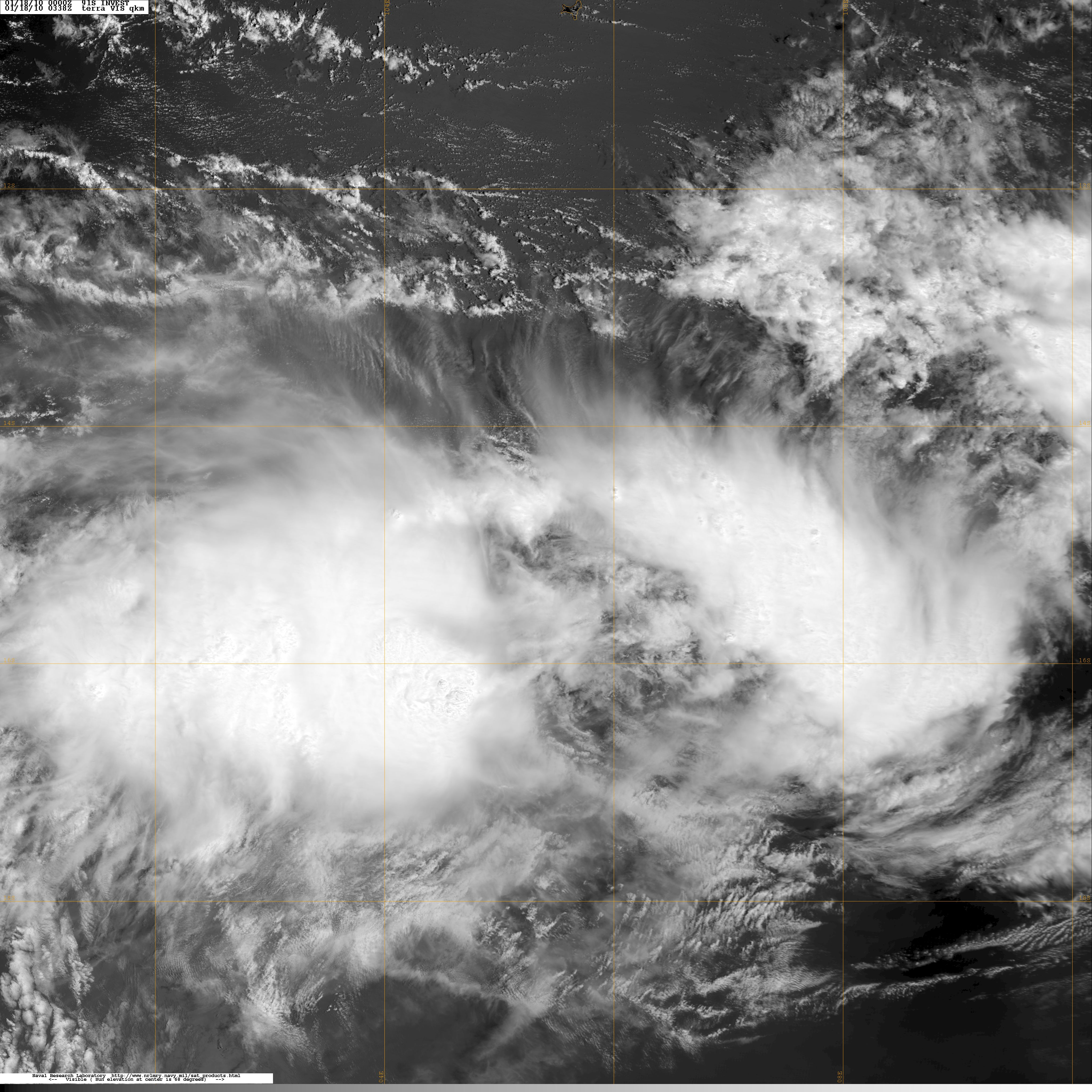
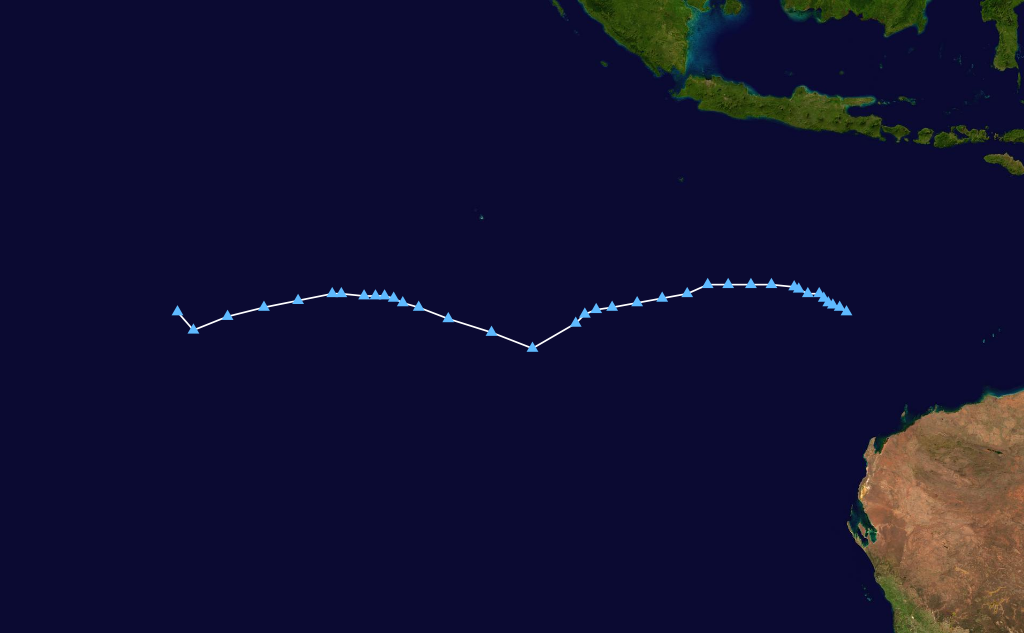
- Duration: 14 January – 21 January

The monsoon trough strengthened over northern Australia, and a tropical low developed off the Pilbara coast on 14 January. Shipping warnings were issued for this system but vertical wind shear prevented the system from intensifying into a Tropical Cyclone.

=== Tropical Cyclone Neville ===
- Category 1 tropical cyclone (Australian scale)
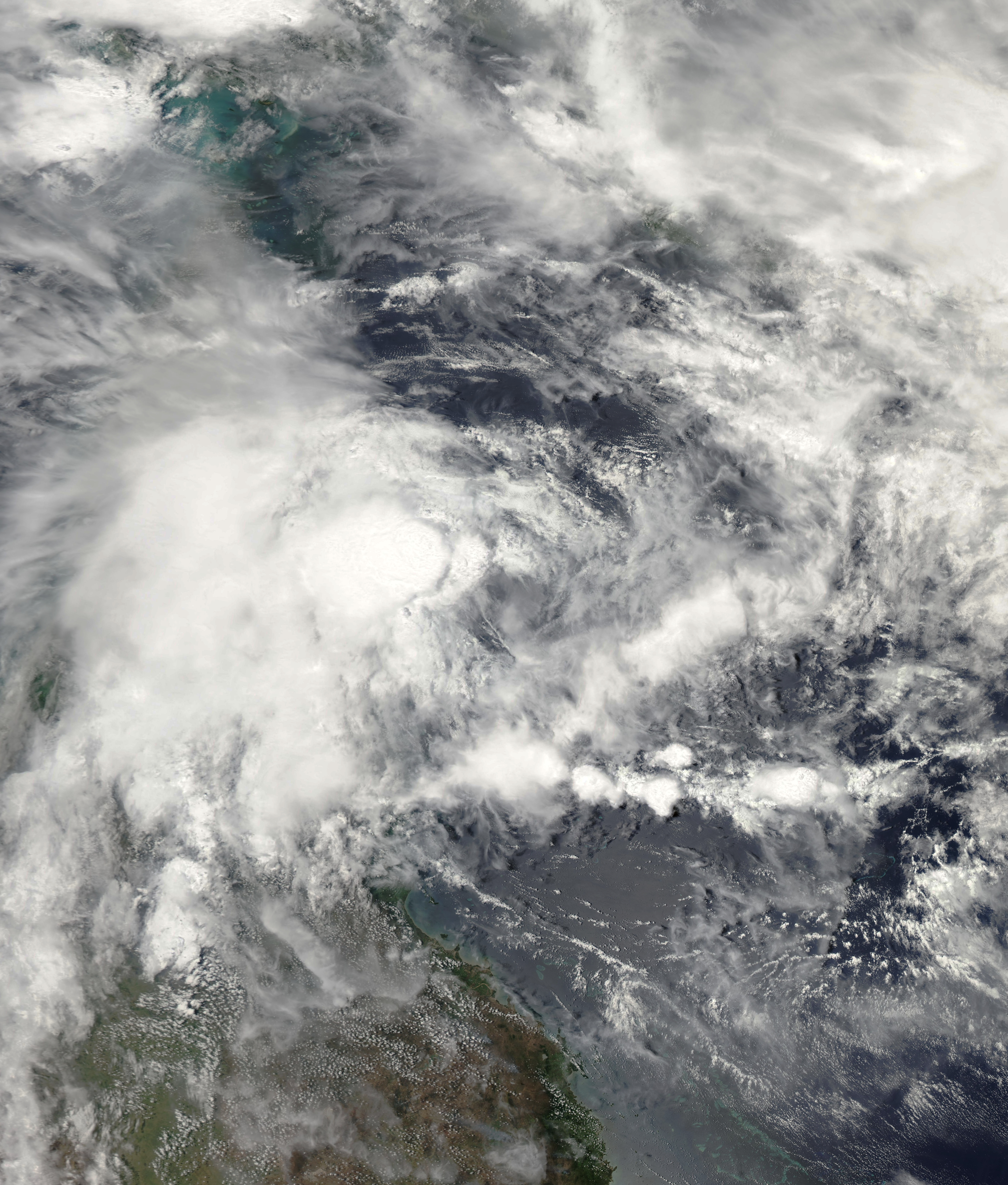
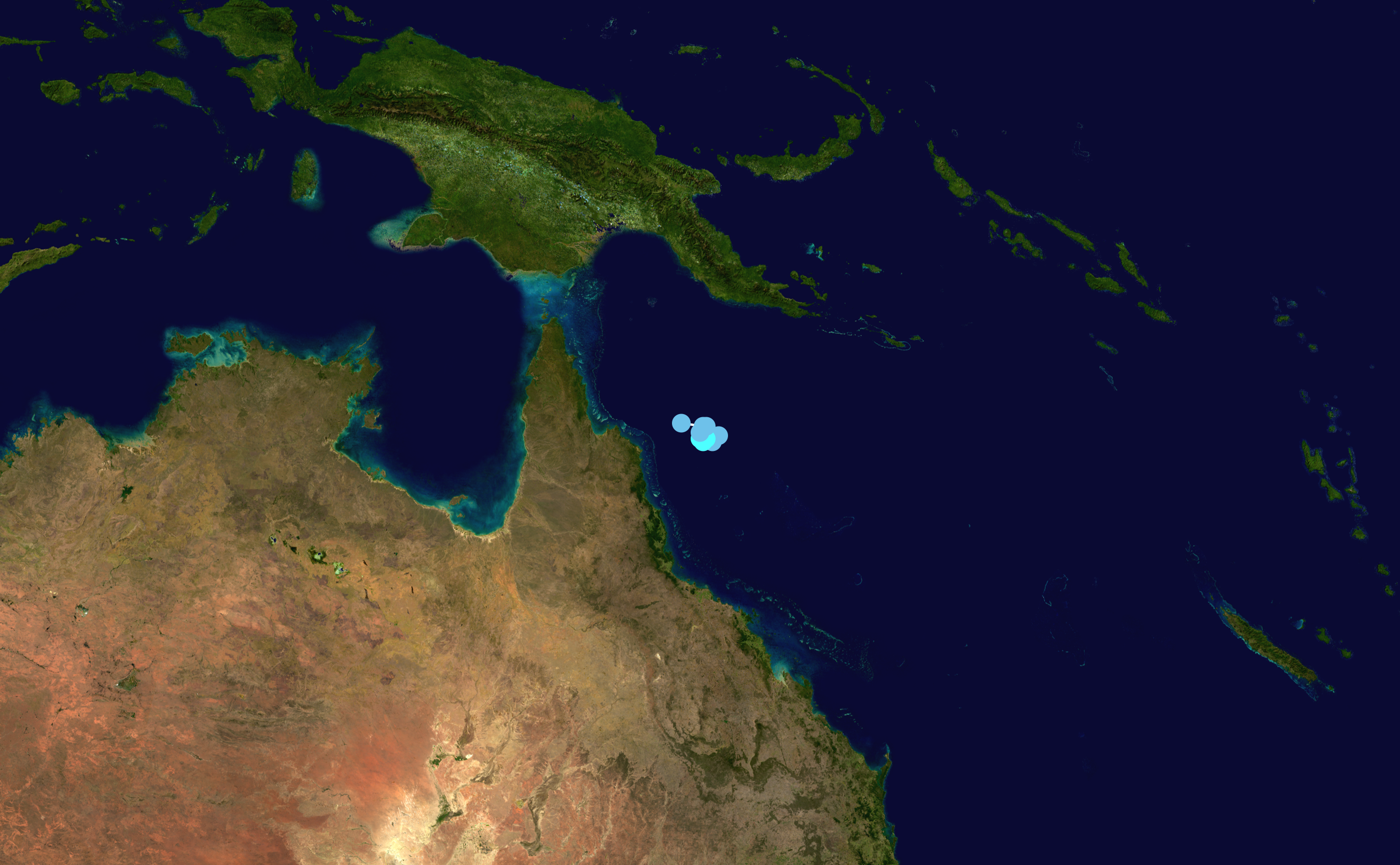
- Duration: 19 January – 21 January
- Peak intensity: 65 km/h (40 mph) (10-min); 995 hPa (mbar)

An undesignated tropical low formed in Darwin's Area of Responsibility, near 11.9ºS 138.5ºE located in the northern Gulf of Carpentaria. On 16 January, the tropical low was designated officially as 05U as it was expected to intensify and move eastward across the gulf. The system did not develop further before it crossed the Cape York Peninsula on 18 January, but after emerging over the Coral Sea it strengthened and was named Tropical Cyclone Neville on 20 January. It was downgraded to a tropical low later in the day. The low remained slow moving off the coast of Queensland until the 23rd, when it commenced an eastward motion, and then dissipated on the 24th.

=== Severe Tropical Cyclone Magda ===
- Category 3 severe tropical cyclone (Australian scale)
- Category 1 tropical cyclone (SSHWS)
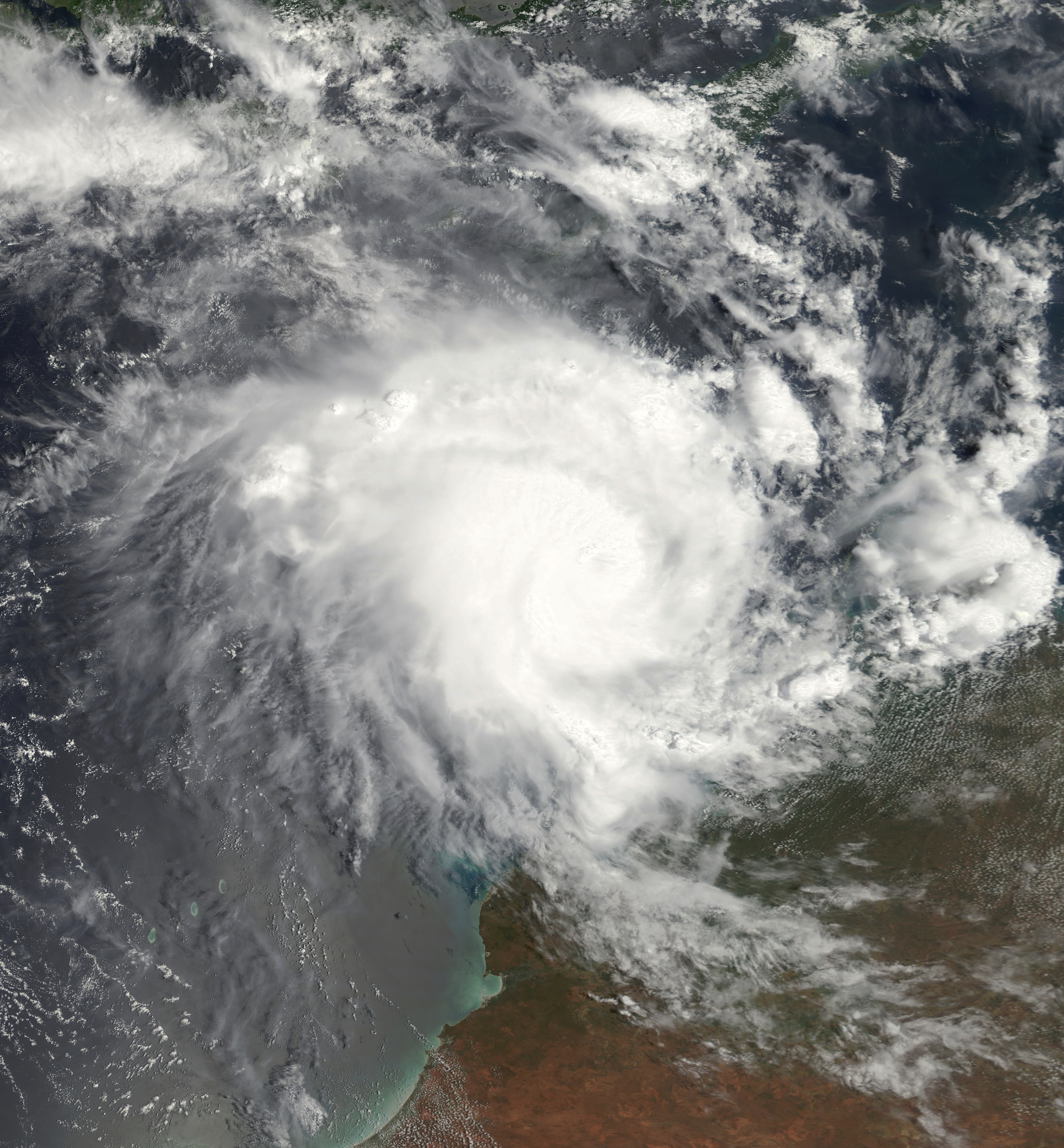
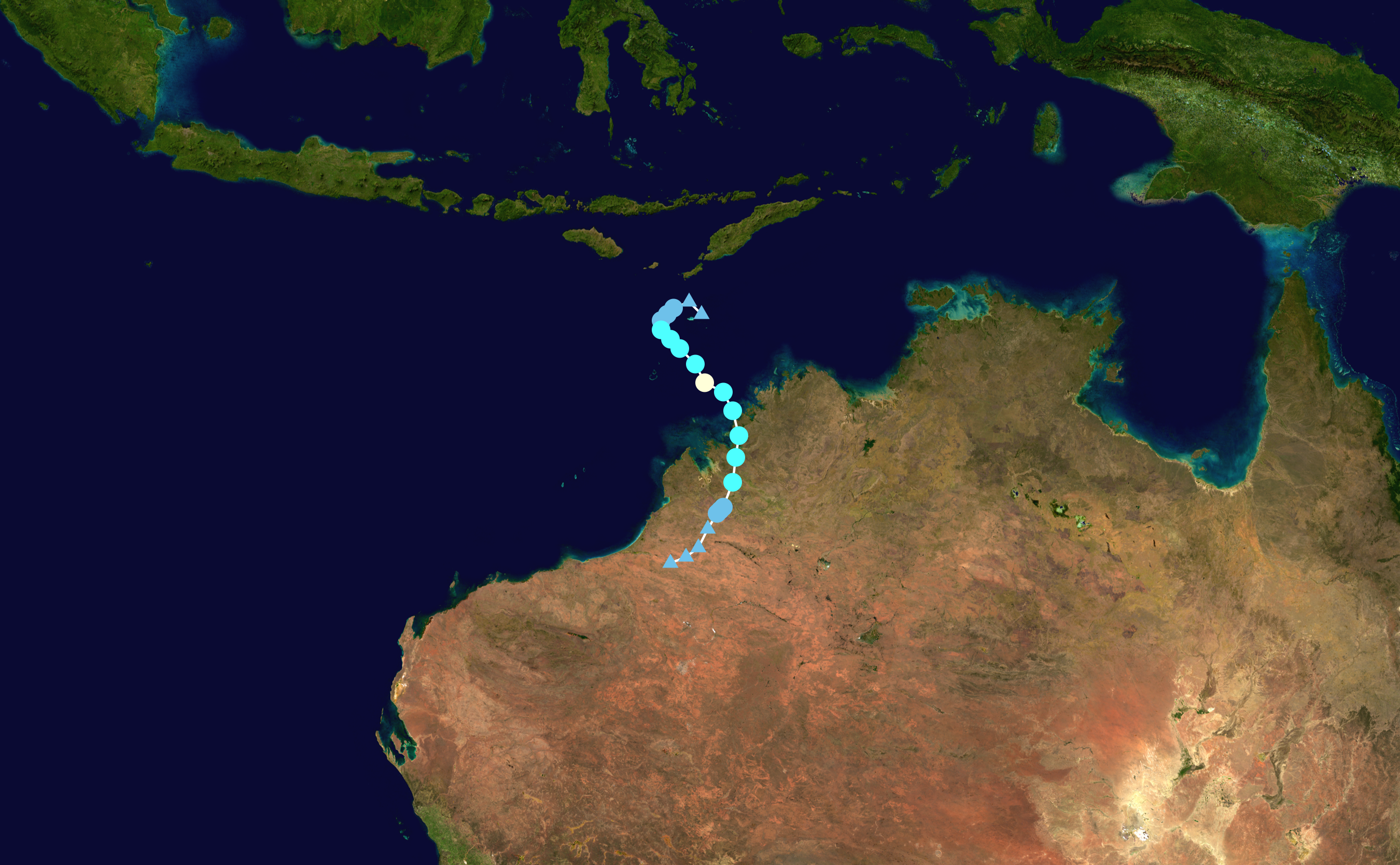
- Duration: 19 January – 24 January
- Peak intensity: 130 km/h (80 mph) (10-min); 975 hPa (mbar)

On 19 January TCWC Perth and Darwin both reported that a Tropical Low had formed south of Timor close to the boundary of their respective areas of responsibility. Shortly after this TCWC Perth issued the designation 06U. It strengthened as it moved southwards, and was designated Tropical Cyclone Magda on 20 January. It made landfall near Kuri Bay late on 21 January as a category three cyclone.

Post-storm analysis upgraded Magda to a category three severe tropical cyclone.

=== Tropical Cyclone Olga ===
- Category 2 tropical cyclone (Australian scale)
- Tropical storm (SSHWS)
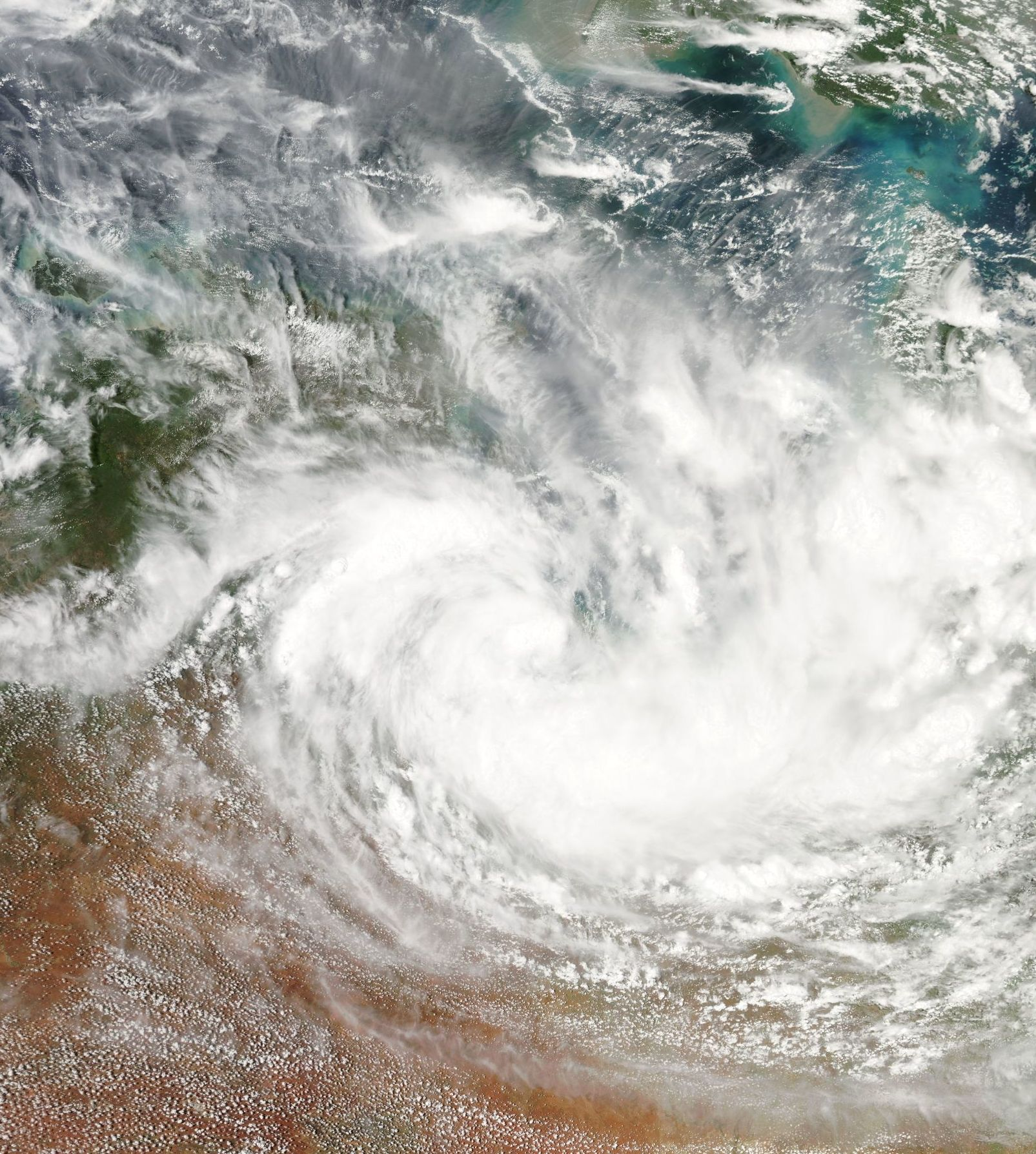
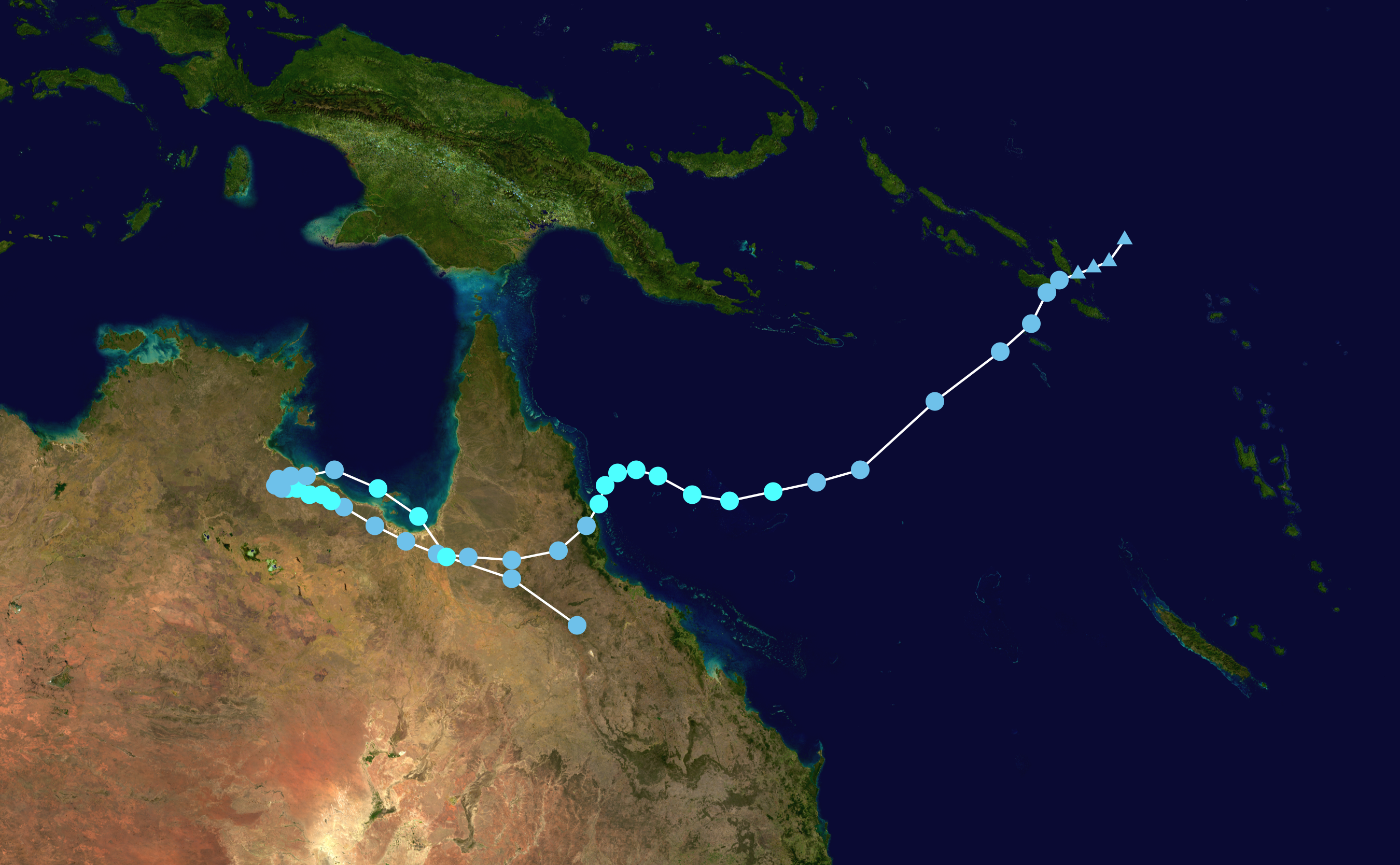
- Duration: 20 January – 30 January
- Peak intensity: 95 km/h (60 mph) (10-min); 983 hPa (mbar)

On 20 January, RSMC Nadi and TCWC Brisbane reported that Tropical Depression 04F had moved into the region from the east and was re-designated as Tropical Low 07U. Late on 22 January, 07U had strengthened into a category one cyclone, and was named by TCWC Brisbane as Tropical Cyclone Olga. By 23 January the cyclone had strengthened into a category two cyclone. On 24 January had weakened significantly was downgraded to a tropical low as it remained near stationary off Cairns. By 26 January the tropical low had crossed the lower Cape York Peninsula and was south of the Gulf of Carpentaria. Warnings were issued for the coastal areas between Burketown and Booroloola. On 28 January Olga was predicted to move offshore and enter the south-western Gulf of Carpentaria and possibly restrengthen into a tropical cyclone again, possibly strengthening to a category three in the southeastern part of the Gulf. A separate outburst of convection developed south of Darwin and tracked northeast toward the Timor Sea on 28 January. On 29 January, Olga had restrengthened into a category 1 tropical cyclone. Finally, Olga degenerated to a tropical low the next day.

The remnants of ex-tropical cyclone Olga then slowly moved south over the next week and merged with a monsoon trough to produce widespread heavy rainfall across Queensland and New South Wales, helping to ease short-term rainfall deficits over these areas.

Olga killed 2 children from New Zealand Camp east of Honiara on the Solomon Islands before it became a cyclone.

=== Tropical Low 08U ===
- Tropical low (Australian scale)
- Duration: 22 February – 24 February

During the February of the last decade, TCWC Darwin reported a tropical low 08U moving over the Northern Territory and Western Queensland. It dissipated on 24 February.

=== Severe Tropical Cyclone Ului ===
- Category 4 severe tropical cyclone (Australian scale)
- Category 4 tropical cyclone (SSHWS)
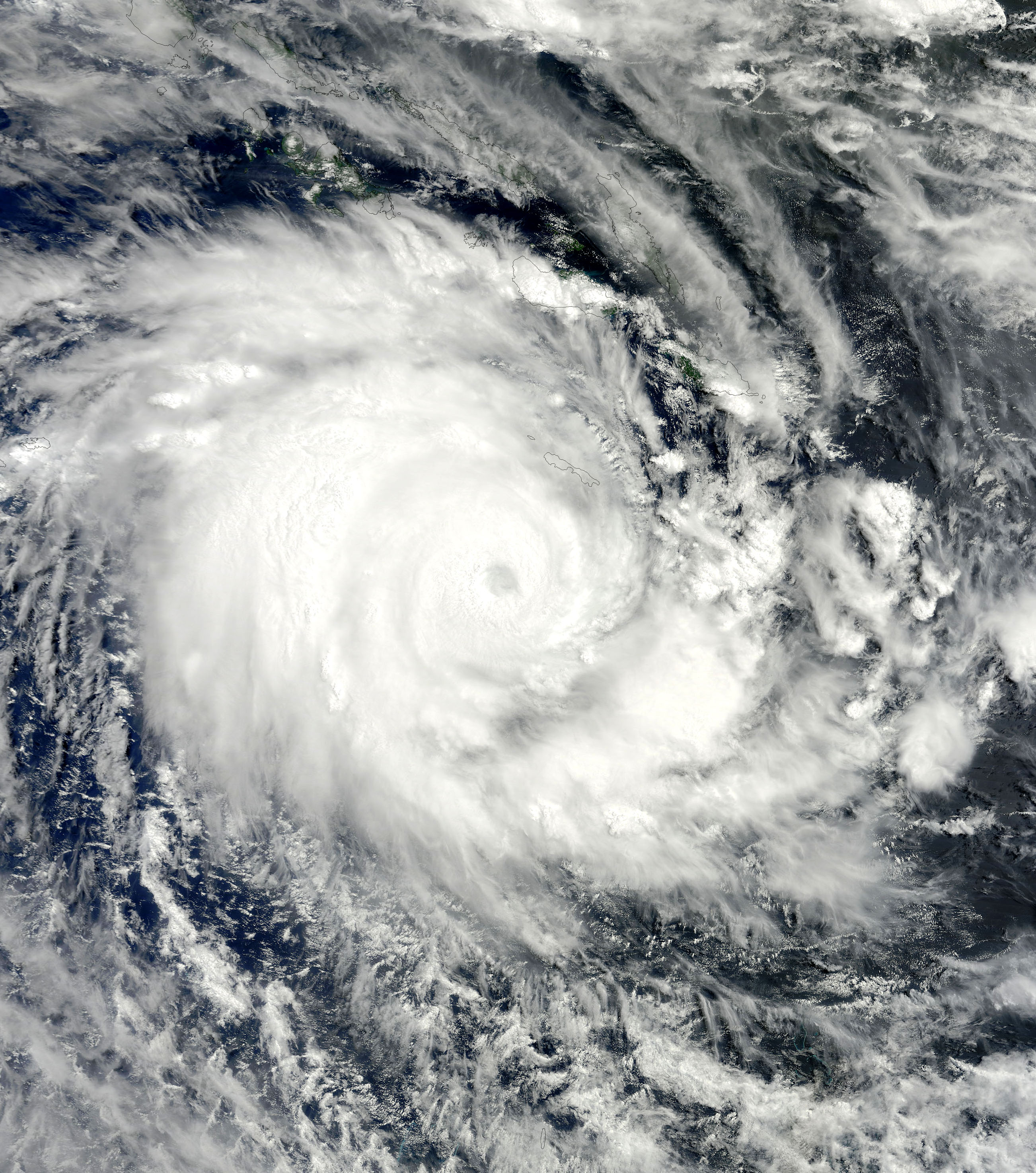
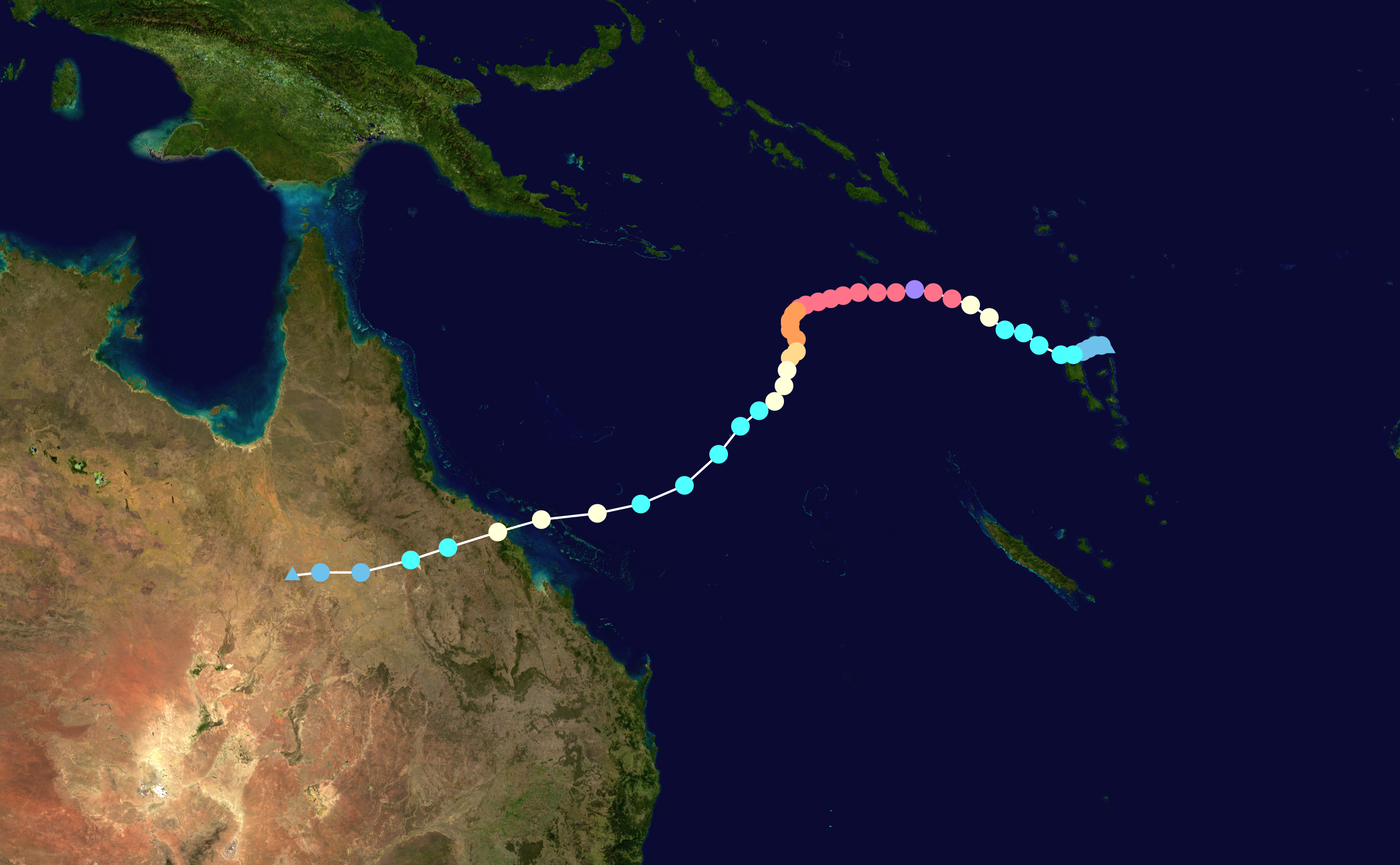
- Duration: 14 March – 21 March
- Peak intensity: 195 km/h (120 mph) (10-min); 937 hPa (mbar)

On 11 March, TCWC Brisbane started to issue warnings on Tropical Depression 13F and designated it as Tropical low 09U. The depression became Cyclone Ului, category 5 in the Pacific basin, but weakened to category 4 shortly after crossing the 160°E meridian. Ului was predicted to restrengthen back into a category 5 as it moved away from an upper-level low and Severe Tropical Cyclone Tomas, however Ului remained as a category 4 and had weakened to a category 3 system in the early hours of 18 March and on the 19 to a category 2, but was expected to restrengthen. As expected, Cyclone Ului became category 3 Severe Tropical Cyclone Ului on 20 March, and maintained its intensity until making landfall near Airlie Beach on the fourth anniversary of Cyclone Larry's landfall on Queensland.

=== Tropical Low 10U (Imani) ===
- Tropical low (Australian scale)
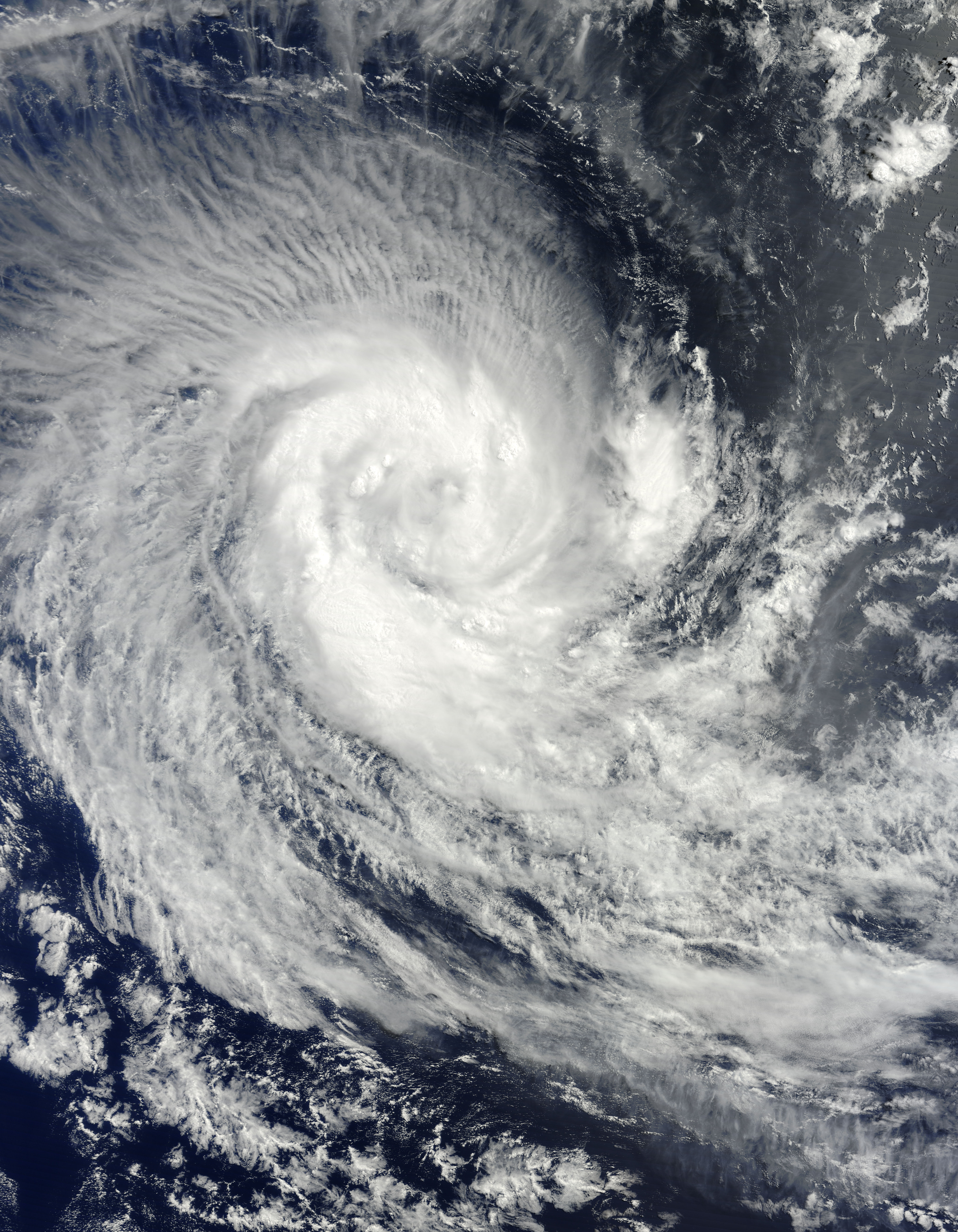
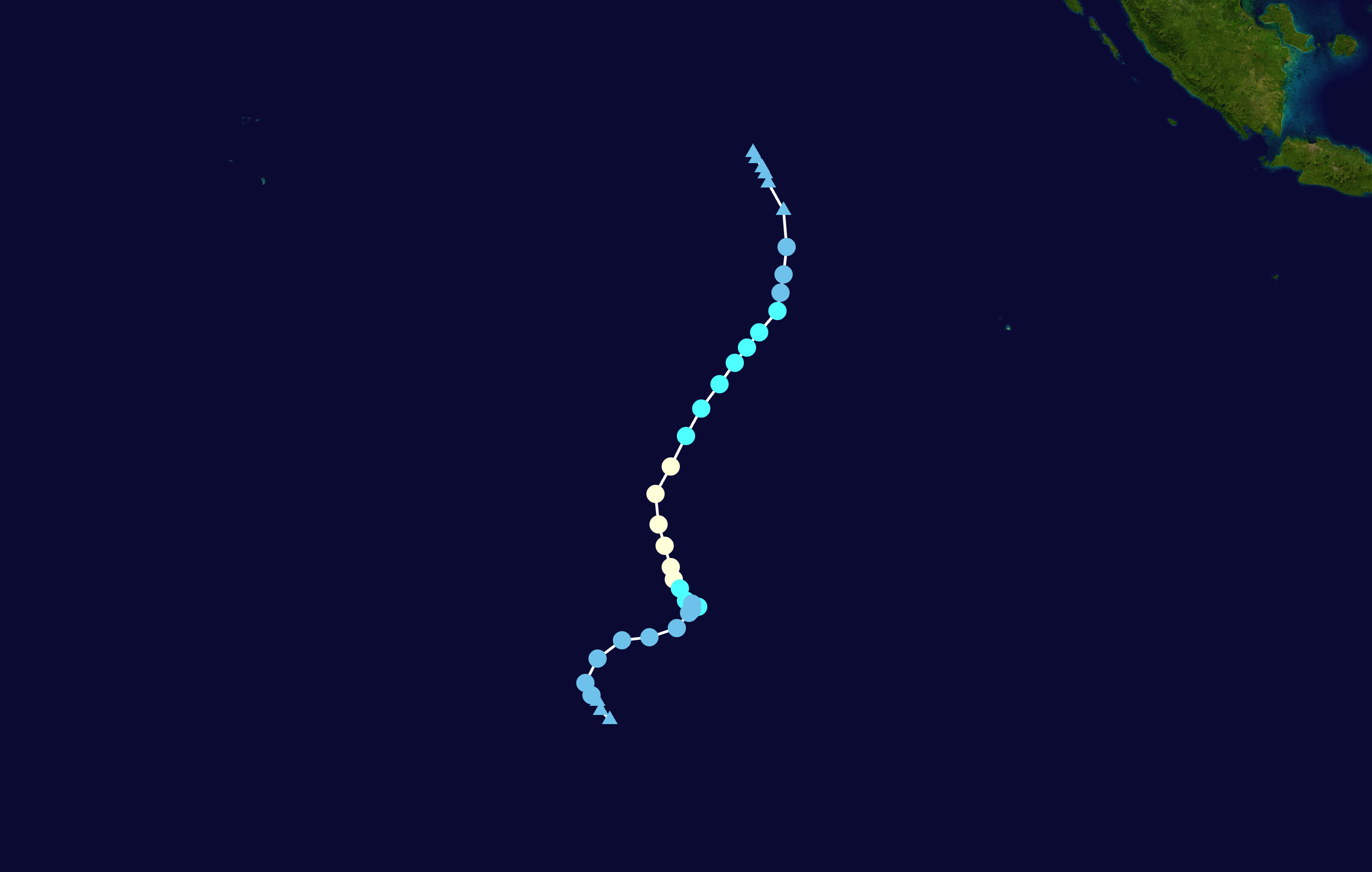
- Duration: 22 March – 22 March (Exited basin)
- Peak intensity: 45 km/h (30 mph) (10-min); 1000 hPa (mbar)

On 22 March, TCWC Perth assigned the designation of 10U to a developing tropical low which was located just inside the southwestern Indian Ocean. Six hours later the RSMC Réunion reported that a tropical disturbance had developed near 10.9° S / 89.9° E in the north-eastern corner of its area of responsibility.

The system stayed west of 90° E and drifted slowly to the southwest and intensified as the RSMC La Réunion took primary forecasting responsibility for the system. There the Mauritius Meteorological Service named the system as Moderate Tropical Storm Imani on 24 March.

=== Severe Tropical Cyclone Paul ===
- Category 3 severe tropical cyclone (Australian scale)
- Category 1 tropical cyclone (SSHWS)
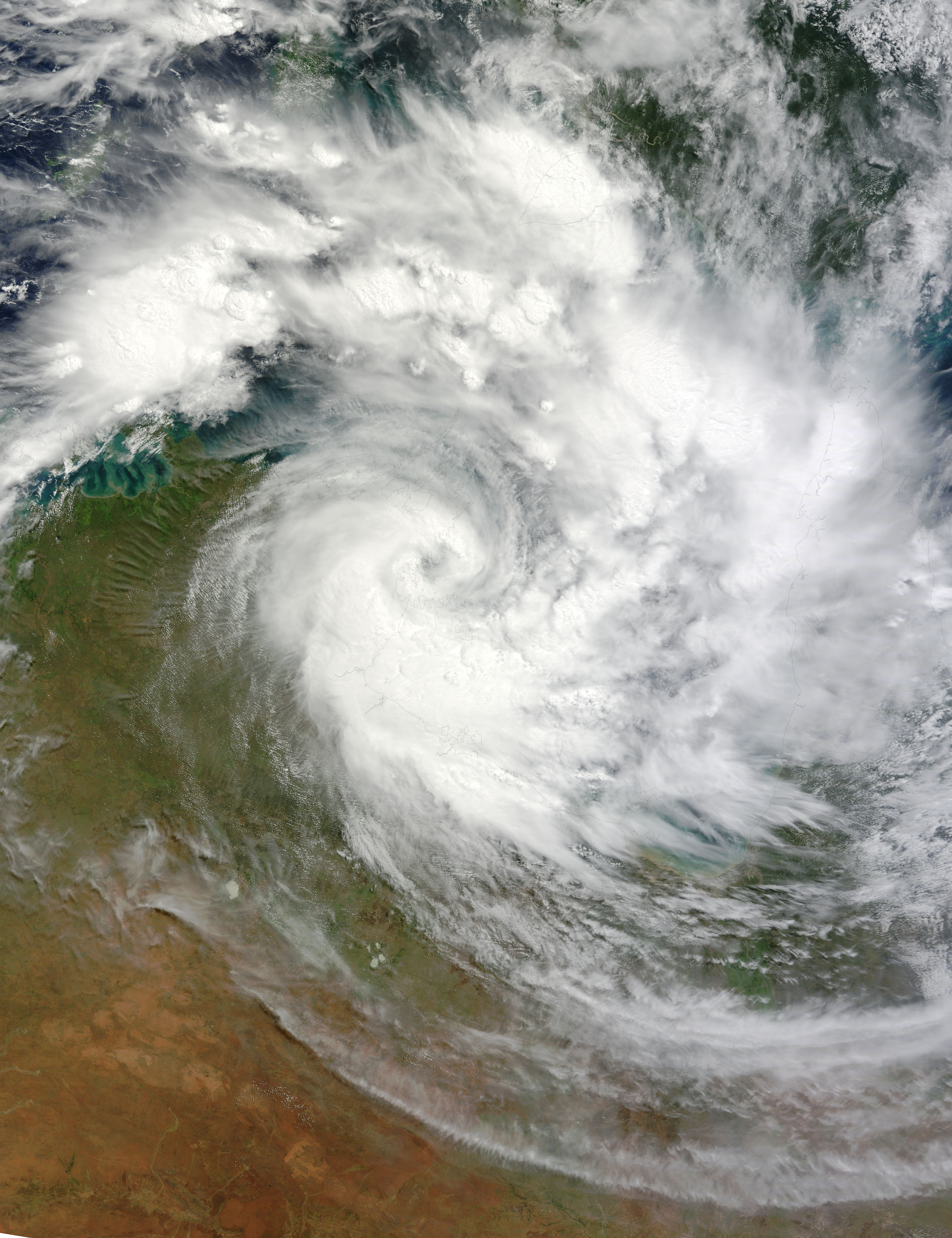
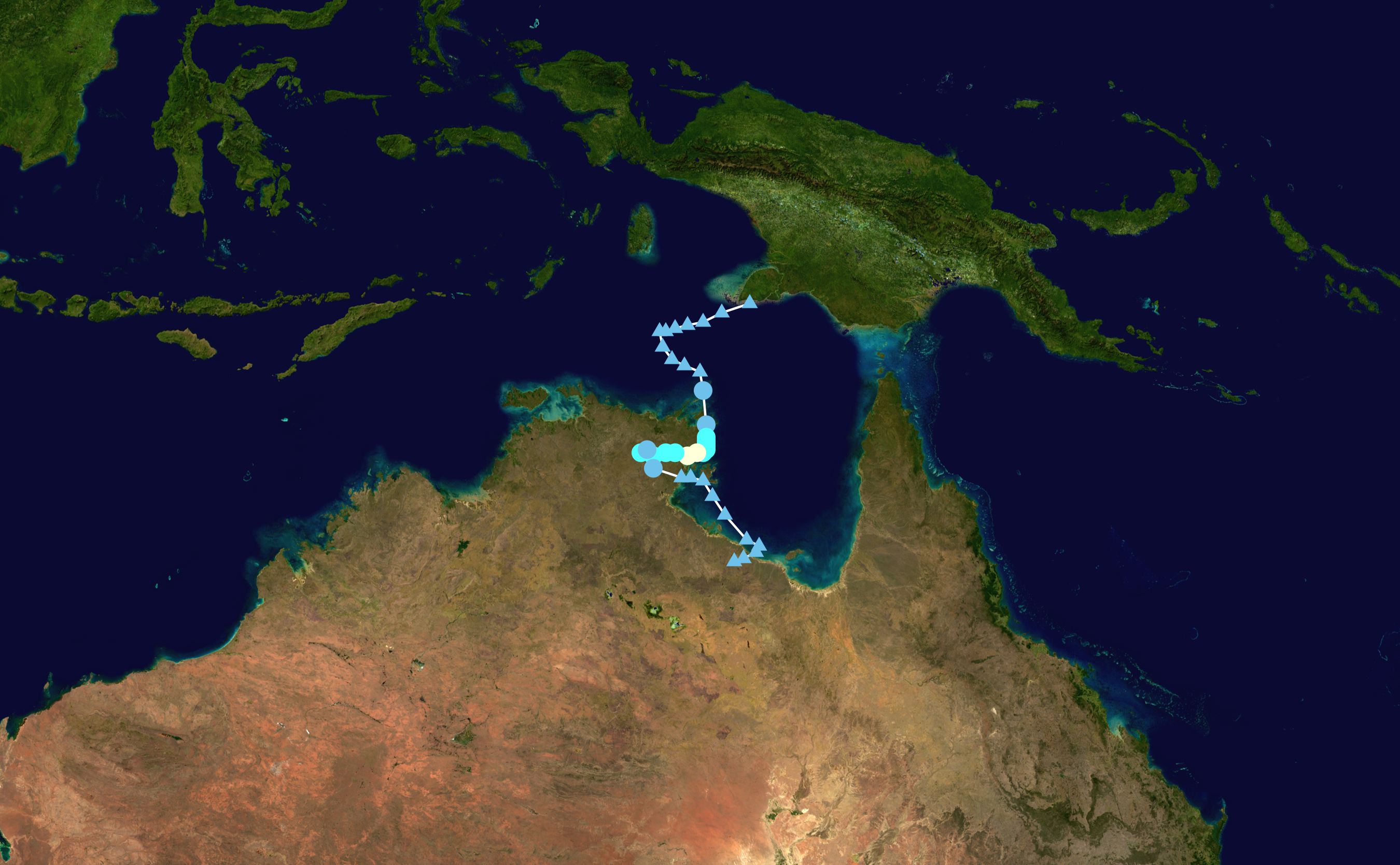
- Duration: 23 March – 3 April
- Peak intensity: 130 km/h (80 mph) (10-min); 971 hPa (mbar)

On 23 March TCWC Darwin reported that a tropical low had formed in the Arafura Sea. On 27 March, Darwin reported that it had strengthened into Tropical Cyclone Paul and was moving southward parallel to the coast in north-east Arnhem Land in the Northern Territory. On 28 March the system had stalled and was nearly stationary in the vicinity of Cape Shield. By 29 March the tropical cyclone had strengthened to a Category 2 cyclone. Later that evening the tropical system made landfall just south of Cape Shield. Over land the tropical system weakened and by afternoon on 30 March was downgraded to a tropical low. Late on 31 March, after meandering over Arnhem Land the tropical system re-entered the Gulf of Carpentaria.

Tropical Cyclone Paul inundated the region with heavy rainfall. Groote Eylandt had reported 40 hours of non stop rain with close areas reporting over 280mm of precipitation. Bulman received 442mm in the same period. Northern Territory Chief Minister Paul Henderson declared an emergency with plans for food drops and evacuations in parts of East Arnhem Land. Even though the system lost its strength it continued to produce vast rainfall totals. Up until 9am on 1 April 160mm fell at McArthur River Mine, their highest daily total in seven years. Borroloola's 185mm in the same period was an 11-year high and Bing Bong amassed 266mm, their highest in more than 14 years.

=== Tropical Cyclone Robyn ===
- Category 2 tropical cyclone (Australian scale)
- Category 1 tropical cyclone (SSHWS)
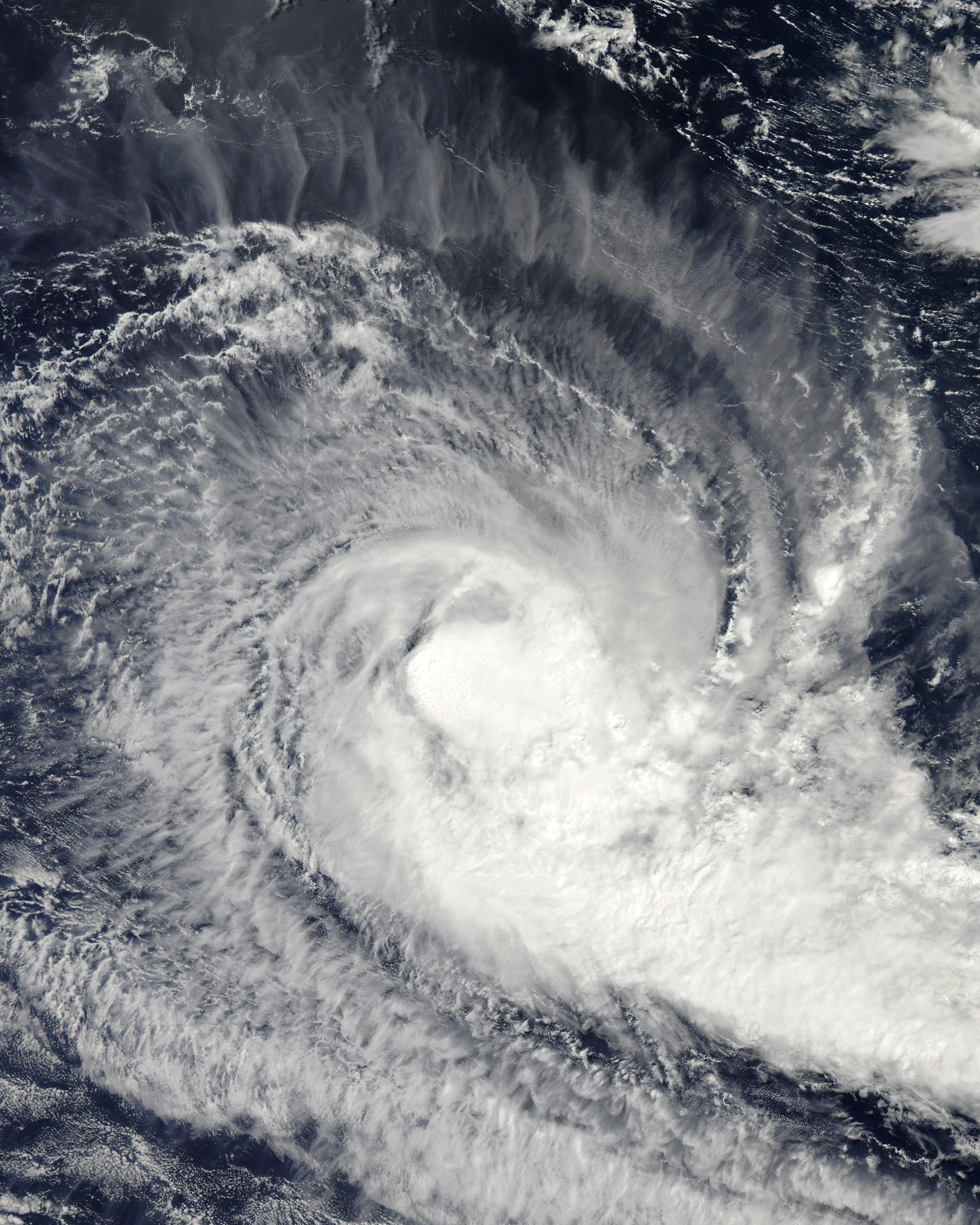
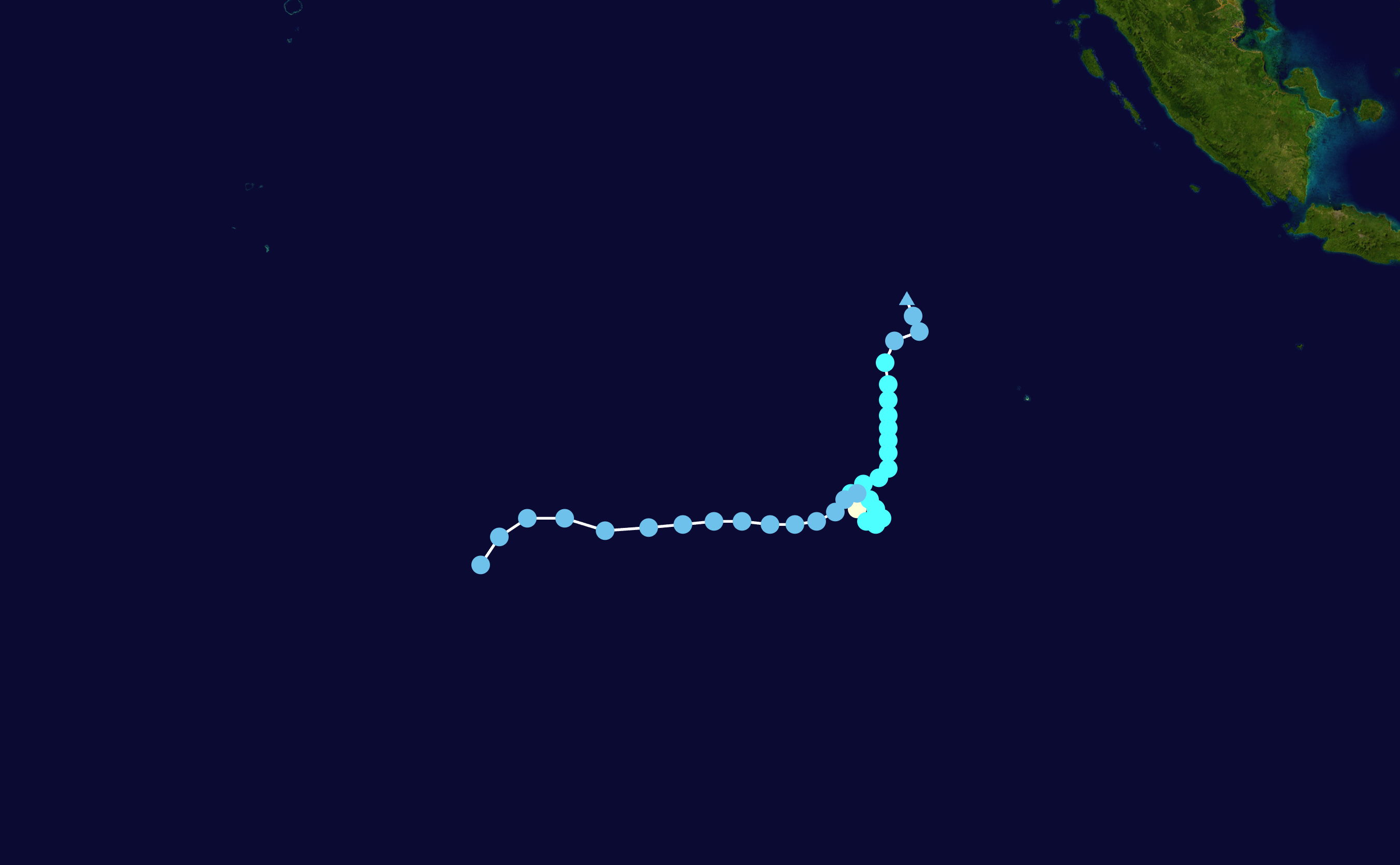
- Duration: 2 April – 7 April
- Peak intensity: 110 km/h (70 mph) (10-min); 980 hPa (mbar)

On 2 April TCWC Perth reported that a Tropical Low had formed at 11.0ºS 92.3ºE. Shortly afterward JTWC classified it as a Tropical Cyclone, reporting the position as 260 nm west of Cocos Island. Moving southwards, it strengthened to Tropical Cyclone Robyn on 3 April, reaching Category 2 the next day. Over the next few hours northwesterly wind shear increased and took its toll on the cyclone. After a counter-clockwise loop the cyclone was steered to the west, due to a strengthening ridge to the southwest of the system. On 6 April 06:00 UTC the TCWC Perth downgraded Robyn to a tropical low.

=== Tropical Cyclone Sean ===
- Category 2 tropical cyclone (Australian scale)
- Tropical storm (SSHWS)
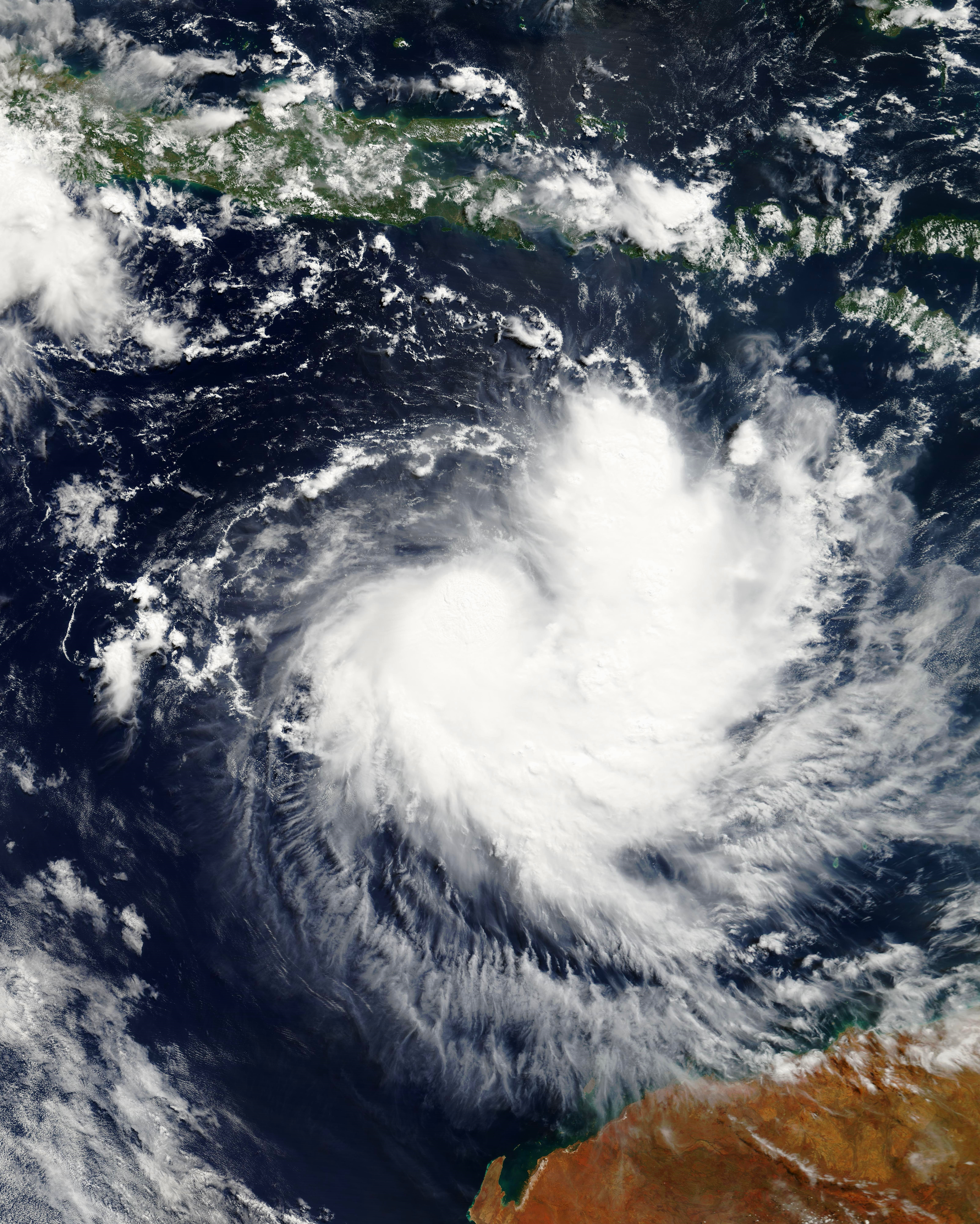
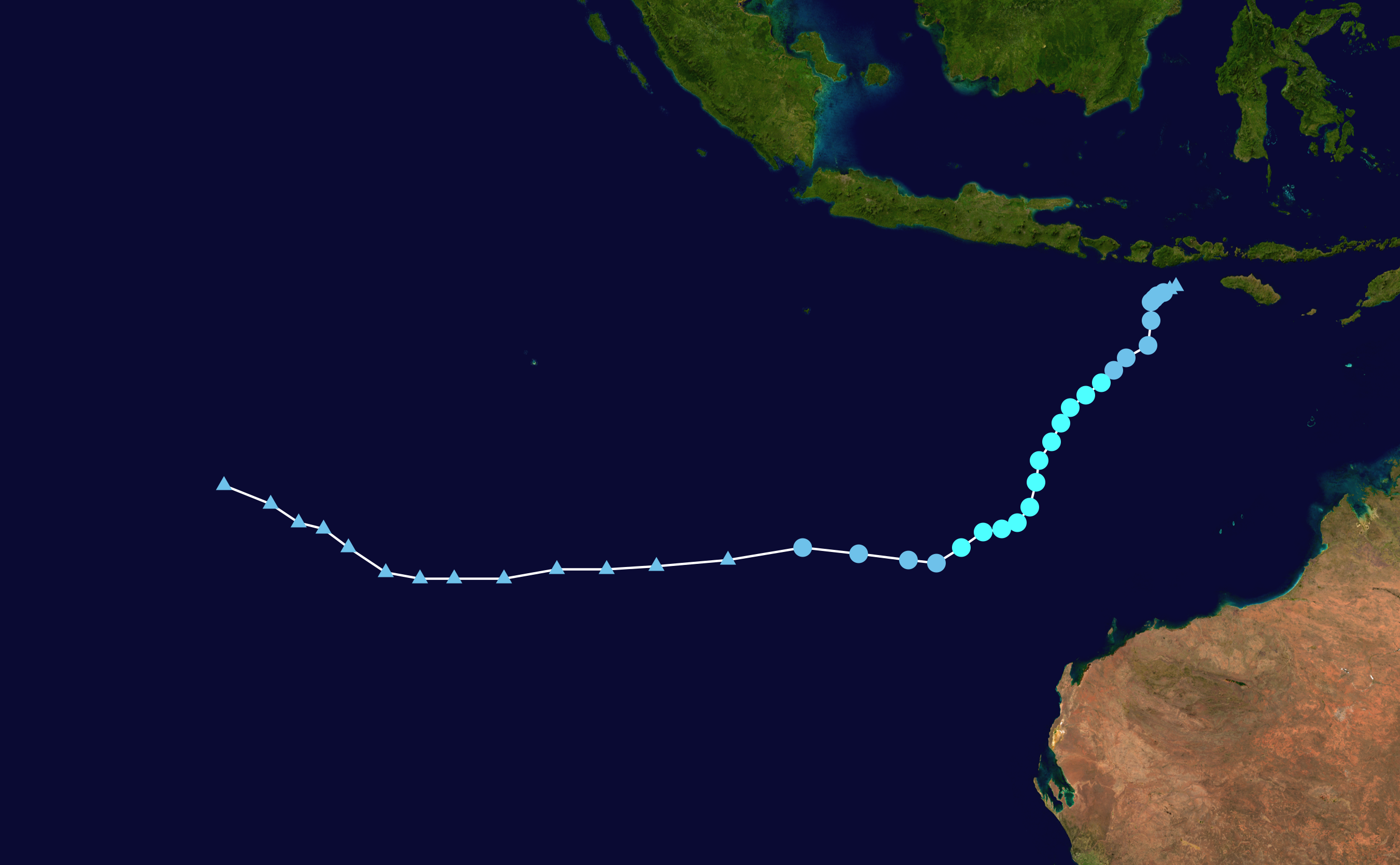
- Duration: 21 April – 25 April
- Peak intensity: 100 km/h (65 mph) (10-min); 988 hPa (mbar)

On 21 April, TCWC Perth reported that a tropical low had formed at 10.3ºS, 116.4ºE, and designated it 13U. The next day it was upgraded to Tropical Cyclone Sean. Sean moved south and kept a steady track. It dissipated on 25 April.

== Retirement ==
After the season, the names Laurence, Magda and Ului were retired by the World Meteorological Organization's RA V Tropical Cyclone Committee.

== Season effects ==
Name	Dates	Peak intensity			Areas affected	Damage (USD)	Deaths	Ref(s).
Name	Dates	Category	Wind speed	Pressure	Areas affected	Damage (USD)	Deaths	Ref(s).
Laurence	8–23 December	Category 5 severe tropical cyclone	205 km/h (125 mph)	925 hPa (27.32 inHg)	Northern Territory, Western Australia	10 million	None	
02U	27 December – 6 January	Tropical Low	45 km/h (30 mph)	1000 hPa (29.53 inHg)	Northern Territory	Unknown	None	
Edzani	1 – 4 January	Tropical Low	45 km/h (30 mph)	1000 hPa (29.53 inHg)	None	None	None	
04U	15 – 21 January	Tropical Low	45 km/h (30 mph)	1000	None	None	None	
Neville	14 – 22 January	Category 1 tropical cyclone	65 km/h (40 mph)	995 hPa (29.38 inHg)	Queensland	Unknown	Unknown	
Magda	18 – 24 January 2010	Category 3 severe tropical cyclone	130 km/h (80 mph)	975 hPa (28.79 inHg)	Western Australia	Unknown	Unknown	
Olga	21 - 30 January	Category 2 tropical cyclone	95 km/h (60 mph)	983 hPa (29.03 inHg)	Solomon Islands, Queensland, Northern Territory	Unknown	2	
08U	22–24 February	Tropical Low			Northern Territory	Unknown	Unknown	
Ului	14–21 March	Category 4 severe tropical cyclone	195 km/h (120 mph)	937 hPa (27.67 inHg)	Queensland	80 million	Unknown	
Imani	22 March	Tropical low	45 km/h (30 mph)	1000	None	None	None	
Paul	24 March – 2 April 2010	Category 3 severe tropical cyclone	130 km/h (80 mph)	971 hPa (28.67 inHg)	Northern Territory	Unknown	Unknown	
Robyn	1–7 April	Category 2 tropical cyclone	110 km/h (70 mph)	980 hPa (28.94 inHg)	None	None	None	
Sean	20 - 25 April 2010	Category 2 tropical cyclone	100 km/h (65 mph)	988 hPa (29.18 inHg)	None	None	None	
Season aggregates
13 systems	8 December – 25 April		205 km/h (125 mph)	925 hPa (27.32 inHg)		$81 million		

== See also ==
- Tropical cyclones in 2009 and 2010
- Atlantic hurricane seasons: 2009, 2010
- Pacific hurricane seasons: 2009, 2010
- Pacific typhoon seasons: 2009, 2010
- North Indian Ocean cyclone seasons: 2009, 2010
- 2009–10 South-West Indian Ocean cyclone season
- 2009–10 South Pacific cyclone season
