= Cyclone Magda =

Category 3 Australian region cyclone in 2010

Severe Tropical Cyclone Magda
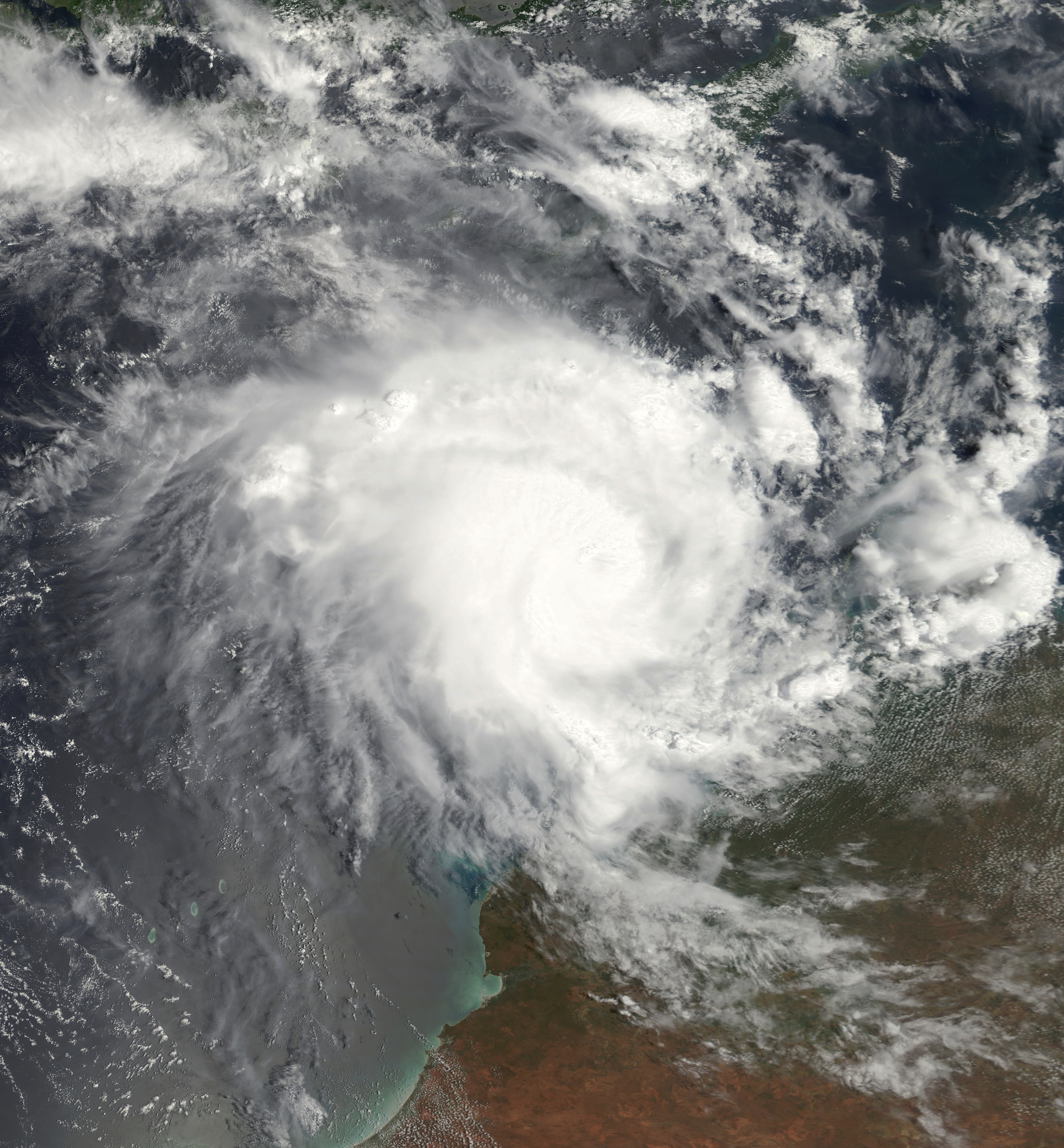
- Cyclone Magda approaching Australia on 21 January

Meteorological history
- Formed: 18 January 2010
- Dissipated: 24 January 2010

Category 3 severe tropical cyclone
- 10-minute sustained (BOM)
- Highest winds: 130 km/h (80 mph)
- Lowest pressure: 975 hPa (mbar); 28.79 inHg

Category 1-equivalent tropical cyclone
- 1-minute sustained (SSHWS/JTWC)
- Highest winds: 120 km/h (75 mph)
- Lowest pressure: 974 hPa (mbar); 28.76 inHg

Overall effects
- Fatalities: None
- Damage: None
- Areas affected: Western Australia
- IBTrACS
- Part of the 2009–10 Australian region cyclone season

Severe Tropical Cyclone Magda was a relatively small tropical cyclone that brought minor damage to parts of Western Australia in January 2010. The third named storm of the 2009–10 Australian region cyclone season, Magda originated from a tropical low near the Indonesian island of Roti on 18 January. Quickly strengthening, the system attained tropical cyclone status on 20 January and later reached severe tropical cyclone intensity on 21 January as it approached Western Australia. Late on 21 January, Magda made landfall in the Kimberley region with winds of 130 km/h (81 mph) before quickly weakening over land. The remnants of Magda persisted until 24 January, at which time they dissipated east of Port Hedland.

Prior to Cyclone Magda's arrival, several severe weather warnings were issued for the coastline of Western Australia. Although the storm made landfall with winds of 130 km/h (81 mph), damage was limited due to the sparsely populated region it struck. The most severe damage was defoliation around Kuri Bay. Following its usage, the name Magda was retired and replaced with Megan, which was first used in the 2023-24 season.

== Meteorological history ==
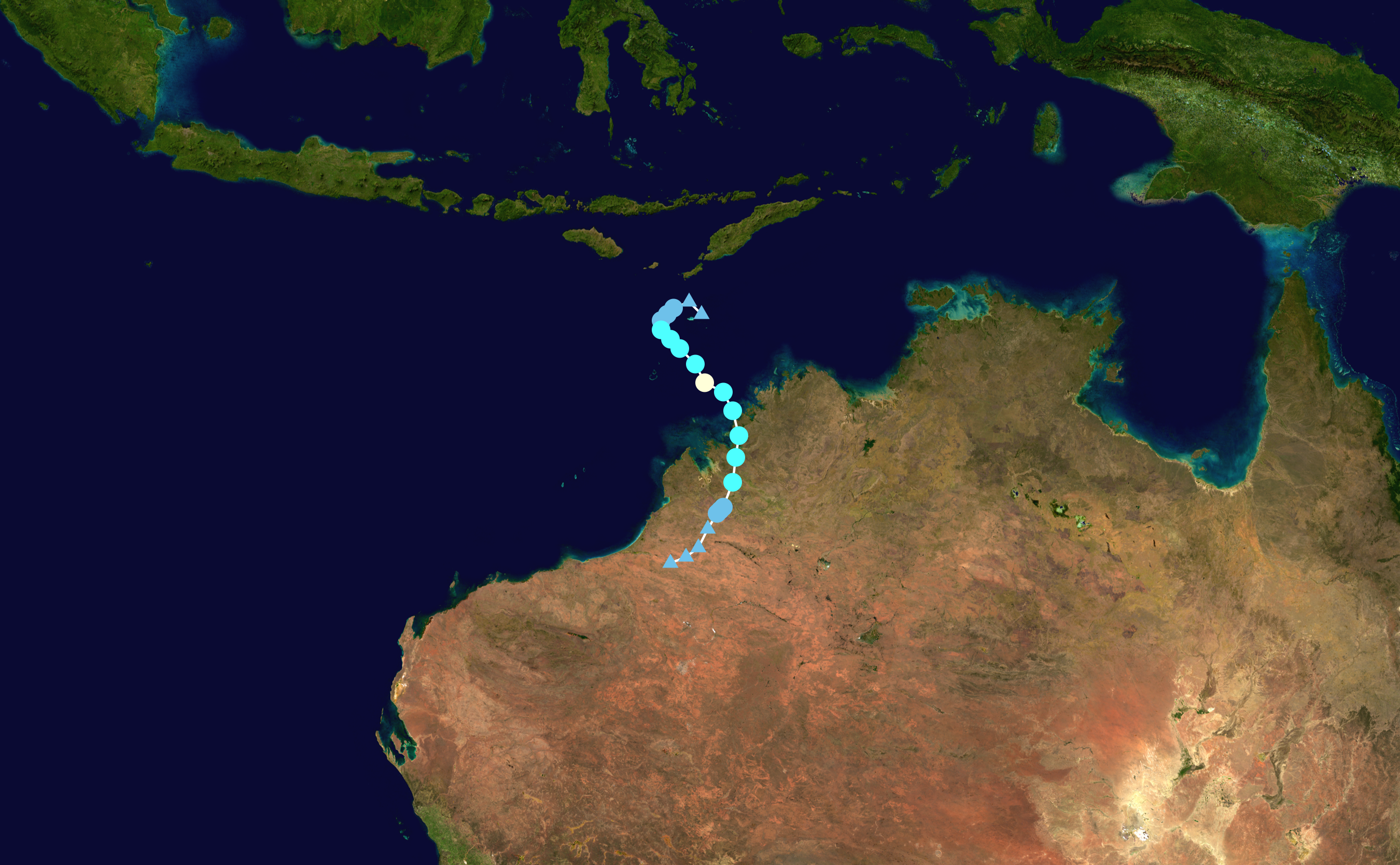
Map plotting the storm's track and intensity, according to the Saffir–Simpson scale Map key Saffir–Simpson scale Tropical depression (≤38 mph, ≤62 km/h) Tropical storm (39–73 mph, 63–118 km/h) Category 1 (74–95 mph, 119–153 km/h) Category 2 (96–110 mph, 154–177 km/h) Category 3 (111–129 mph, 178–208 km/h) Category 4 (130–156 mph, 209–251 km/h) Category 5 (≥157 mph, ≥252 km/h) Unknown Storm type Tropical cyclone Subtropical cyclone Extratropical cyclone, remnant low, tropical disturbance, or monsoon depression

Severe Tropical Cyclone Magda originated from a tropical low that was first identified by the Australian Bureau of Meteorology (BOM) on 18 January 2010 near the Indonesian island of Roti. Initially situated in a weak steering environment, the low drifted towards the southwest and gradually gained intensity. The following day, the Joint Typhoon Warning Center (JTWC) also began monitoring the system. Throughout 19 January, a developing low-level circulation showed improved organisation, feature deep convection over its centre. Atmospheric conditions in the region favoured further development, featuring low to moderate wind shear. A trough situated near the coast of Western Australia aided in improving the low's outflow. Later that day, the JTWC issued a Tropical Cyclone Formation Alert on the system; they expected the low to intensify into a tropical cyclone within the following 24 hours.

Early on 20 January, the BOM upgraded the low to a tropical cyclone, at which time it was given the name Magda. However, there is uncertainty whether the system actually obtained this strength or if it strengthened hours later. At the time of the upgrade, Magda featured deep convection over its centre, but banding features extended a little more than halfway around the circulation. Later that day, the small cyclone underwent a period of rapid intensification as an eye feature became apparent in satellite imagery. In response to an approaching trough, Magda tracked towards the southeast. Around 2100 UTC, the JTWC issued their first advisory on Magda, designating it as Tropical Cyclone 08S. Over the following several hours, the eye feature became increasingly defined, allowing the storm to intensify into a severe tropical cyclone by 0000 UTC on 21 January. Upon reaching this strength, Magda attained ten-minute sustained winds of 120 km/h (75 mph) and a barometric pressure of 978 mbar (hPa; 28.88 inHg). However, shear abruptly increased hours later, causing the low-level circulation of Magda to become displaced from the deepest convection.

As the storm continued to near landfall in Australia, it re-intensified as deep convection redeveloped over its centre, combined with the formation of an eye. Around 1800 UTC on 21 January, Magda was classified as a severe tropical cyclone for the second time. Within hours of reattaining severe tropical cyclone status, Magda passed over Augustus Island. Around 2100 UTC, the storm reached its peak intensity with winds of 130 km/h (81 mph) and a pressure of 975 mbar (hPa; 28.79 inHg). Initially, the JTWC estimated the system to have peaked as a strong tropical storm with one-minute sustained winds of 110 km/h (68 mph); however, further analysis of the system resulted in an upgrade to a minimal Category 1 equivalent with winds of 120 km/h (75 mph). Further uncertainty in the storm's peak intensity exists through data from AMSU and CIMSS which estimated peak one-minute sustained winds of 133 and 150 km/h (83 and 93 mph) respectively.

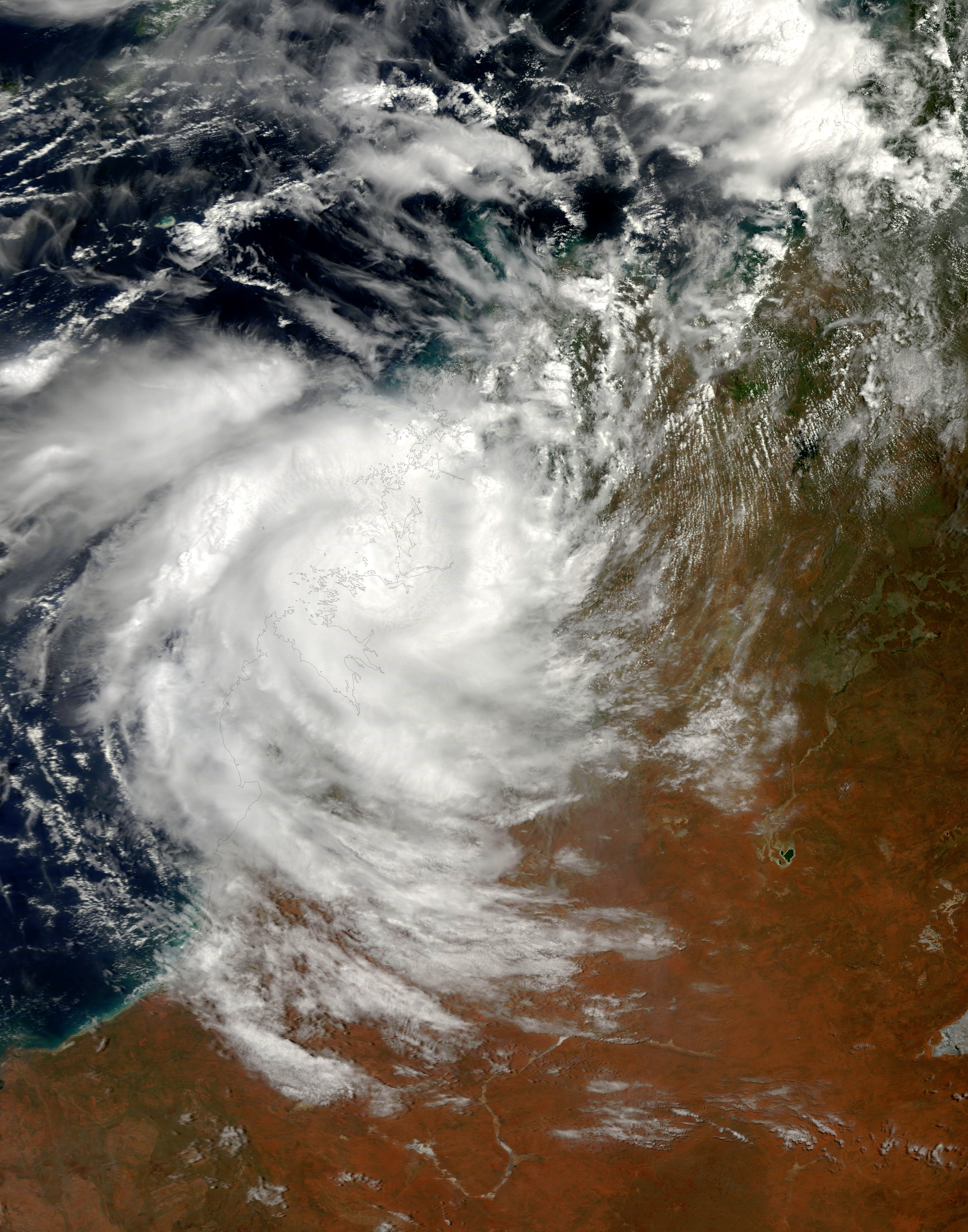
Cyclone Magda shortly before its final landfall in Western Australia on 22 January

Around the time when the cyclone made landfall, gale-force winds extended roughly 85 km (53 mi) from the centre of Magda, classifying it as a "midget" cyclone. The system made its second landfall near Kuri Bay, a remote area in the Kimberley region, at peak strength before it began to weaken. Early on 22 January, the storm briefly moved back over water, having weakened slightly, before making another landfall east of the Buccaneer Archipelago with winds of 110 km/h (68 mph). Later that day, Magda passed directly over the town of Derby, where winds were measured under gale-force. This prompted the BOM to downgrade the system to a tropical low. Once the trough which initially steered Magda into Western Australia relaxed, the system slowly turned towards the south-southwest before fully dissipating early on 24 January east of Port Hedland.

== Preparations and impact ==
As Cyclone Magda approached the Western Australian coastline, severe weather warnings were issued for parts of the Kimberley region. Initial forecasts indicated that it would obtain Category 4 intensity and produce destructive winds up to 250 km/h (160 mph). A mining company, working in Mount Gibson on Koolan Island, evacuated 228 employees due to the threat of the cyclone. However, 64 members of an emergency crew would remain behind in a cyclone shelter. Hours before the storm made landfall, a red alert, the highest level of storm alert, was issued for areas around where the storm was expected to move onshore. The State Emergency Service warned that all residents around Kuri Bay "need to go to shelter immediately." Heavy rains in excess of 100 mm (3.9 in) were expected to fall along the storm's track. Most of the alerts remained in place until Magda weakened to a tropical low on 22 January.

Although Magda made landfall as a severe tropical cyclone, it struck a sparsely populated region. Rainfall peaked at 185 mm (7.3 in) in Kuri Bay over a three-day span. Near where the storm made landfall, wind gusts were estimated up to 185 km/h (115 mph), resulting in significant defoliation and affecting a few structures. A few homes around Kuri Bay sustained roof damage, but no injuries were reported.

Although damage in relation to the cyclone was limited, the name Magda was retired following its usage and was later replaced with Megan.

== See also ==
- 2009–10 Australian region cyclone season
- Timeline of the 2009–10 Australian region cyclone season
