= Bongani =

Bongani can refer to:

- Bongani (given name), masculine given name
- Bongani, South Africa, an informal settlement in Knysna Local Municipality
- Tropical Storm Bongani, tropical storm affecting Mayotte and Comoros in November 2009
