= Msomi =

Msomi is a surname. Notable people with the surname include:

- Bongani Msomi, South African politician
- Bongiwe Msomi (born 1988), South Africa netball player and coach
- Elifasi Msomi (1910–1956), South African serial killer
- Mandla Msomi (born 1950), South African politician and businessman
- Sibusiso Msomi (born 1988), South African footballer
- Welcome Msomi (1943–2020), South African playwright, actor, and writer
