= Bongani (given name) =

Bongani is a masculine given name, derived from the Nguni word bonga, meaning "to give thanks."

. Notable people with the given name include:

- Bongani Jele (born 1986), South African cricket umpire
- Bongani Khumalo (born 1987), South African footballer
- Bongani Mahlangu (born 1979), South African boxer
- Bongani Masuku, South African vocalist
- Bongani Sam (born 1997), South African footballer
- Bongani Mayosi (1967–2018), South African cardiology professor
- Bongani Msomi, South African politician
- Bongani Mwelase (born 1982), South African boxer
- Bongani Ndodana-Breen (born 1975), South African composer
- Bongani Ndulula (born 1989), South African footballer
- Bongani Zungu (born 1992), South African footballer
