= Bongani Masuku =

- Born: 1964 (age 61–62)
- Citizenship: South Africa
- Occupation: Singer

Bongani Masuku was a South African vocalist best known as the backing vocalist of Johnny Clegg's band. In addition he also toured with I Muvrini on three European tours.

He was shot dead during an altercation with thieves on May 17, 2014, aged 50.
