= 2009–10 South-West Indian Ocean cyclone season =

Cyclone season in the Southwest Indian Ocean

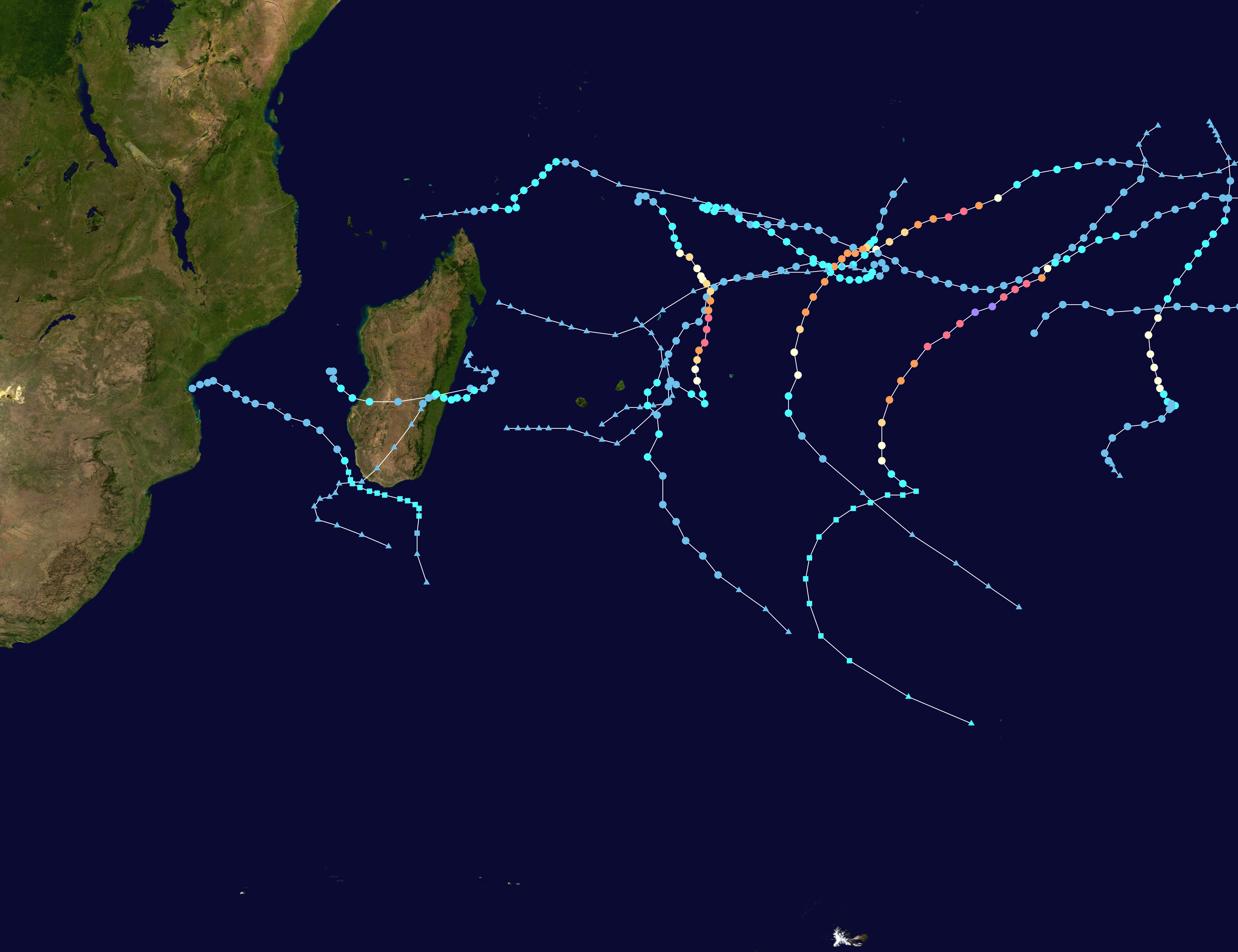
- Season summary map

Seasonal boundaries
- First system formed: August 18, 2009
- Last system dissipated: May 29, 2010

Strongest storm
- Name: Edzani
  - Maximum winds: 220 km/h (140 mph) (10-minute sustained)
  - Lowest pressure: 910 hPa (mbar)

Seasonal statistics
- Total disturbances: 16
- Total depressions: 12
- Total storms: 9
- Tropical cyclones: 5
- Intense tropical cyclones: 4
- Very intense tropical cyclones: 1
- Total fatalities: 85 total
- Total damage: Unknown

Related articles
- Timeline of the 2009–10 South-West Indian Ocean cyclone season; 2009–10 Australian region cyclone season; 2009–10 South Pacific cyclone season

The 2009–10 South-West Indian Ocean tropical cyclone season was a near average event in tropical cyclone formation. The season officially started on July 1, 2009, and ended on June 30, 2010, after incorporating the tropical cyclone season which ran from November 1 to April 30 for all areas except for Mauritius and the Seychelles, for which it ended on May 15, 2010. In this basin which officially runs from 30 to 90E, and is, to the south of the equator, the main warning center is the Regional Specialized Meteorological Center on La Réunion Island (RSMC La Réunion); however they delegate the naming of Cyclones to the Meteorological services of Mauritius and Madagascar.

It was predicted by the Mauritius Meteorological service that there would be between nine and eleven named storms in the South West Indian Ocean during the season. Their further assessment that there was a good probability of a named storm forming in November was justified when Tropical Cyclone Anja formed on November 14.

== Systems ==
=== Tropical Disturbance 01 ===
- Tropical disturbance (MFR)
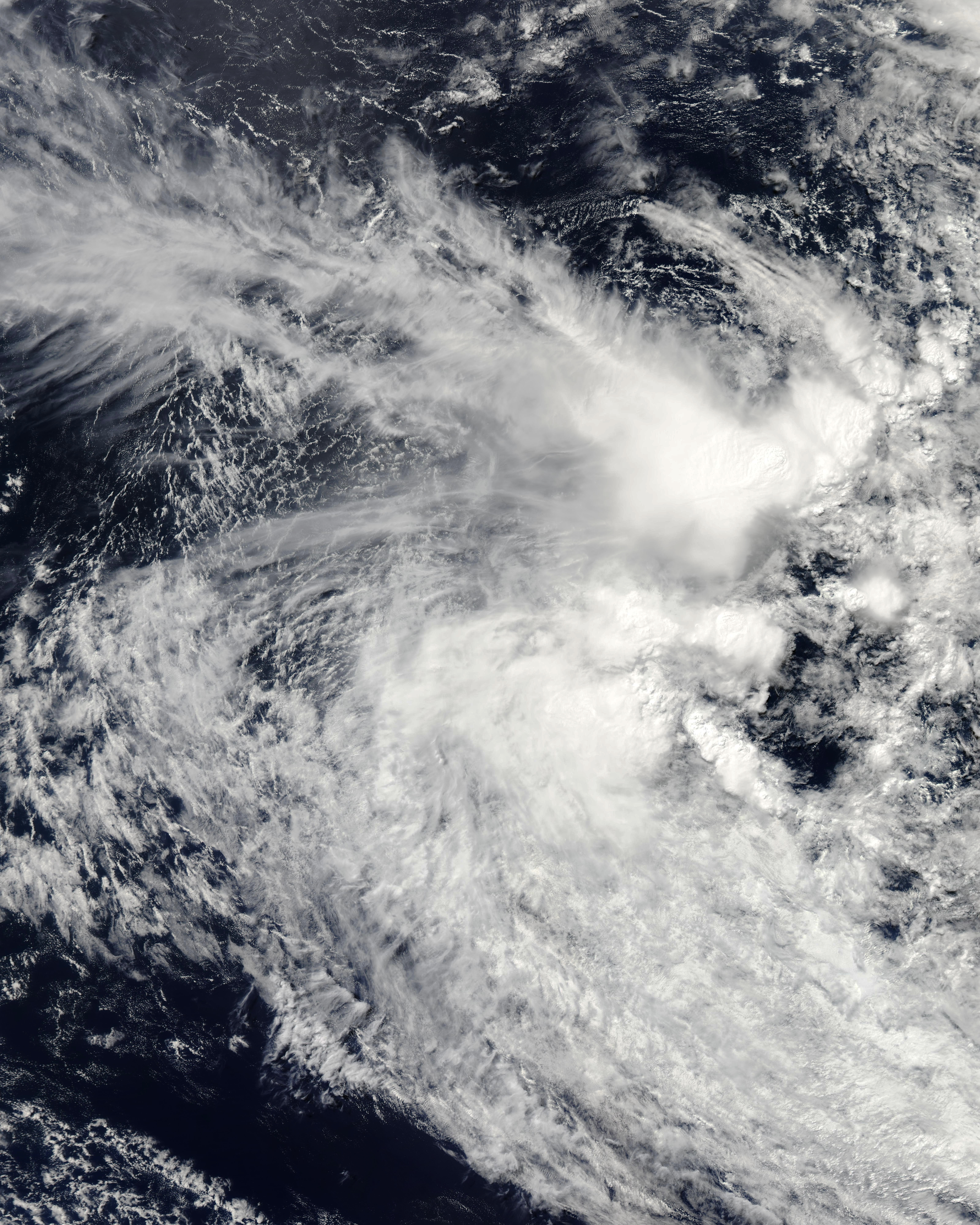
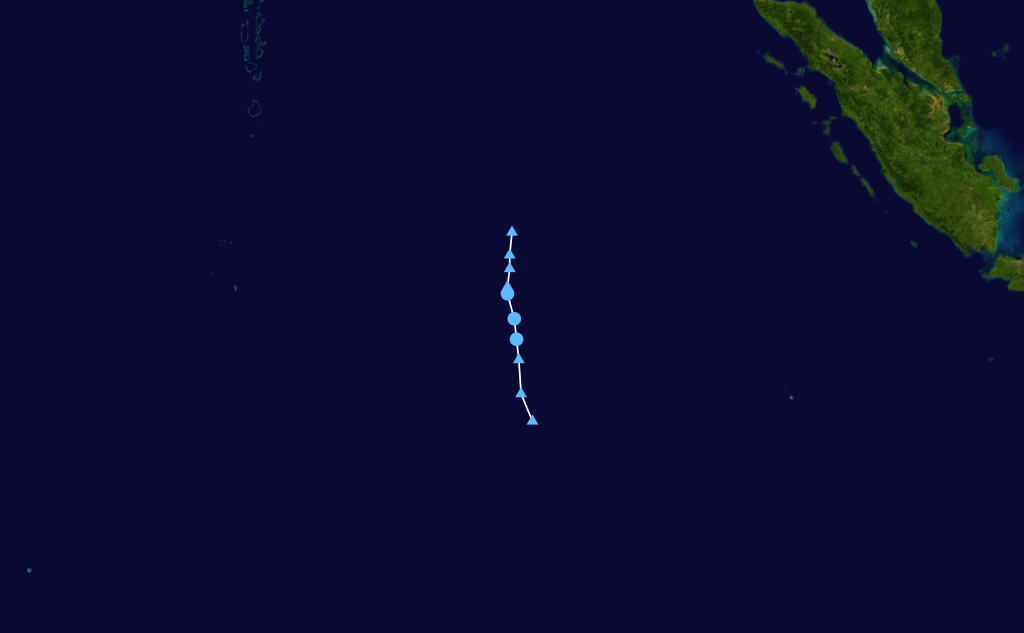
- Duration: August 18 – August 20
- Peak intensity: 35 km/h (25 mph) (10-min); 1004 hPa (mbar)

Early on August 17, the JTWC reported that an area of disturbed weather had formed about 1200 kilometres, (750 miles), to the east of Diego Garcia. The convection had a developed low level circulation center, however convection had not started to consolidate around it and was in an area of strong vertical wind shear. During that day the disturbance gradually developed further as the environment around it gradually improved and was designated as Tropical Disturbance 01 by RSMC La Réunion early the next day. However, later that day they downgraded it to a zone of disturbed weather and released their final advisory on the disturbance as it had remained weak with the low level circulation center remaining weak and exposed. Over the next few days it weakened further before dissipating on August 20.

=== Zone of Disturbed Weather 02 ===
- Zone of disturbed weather (MFR)
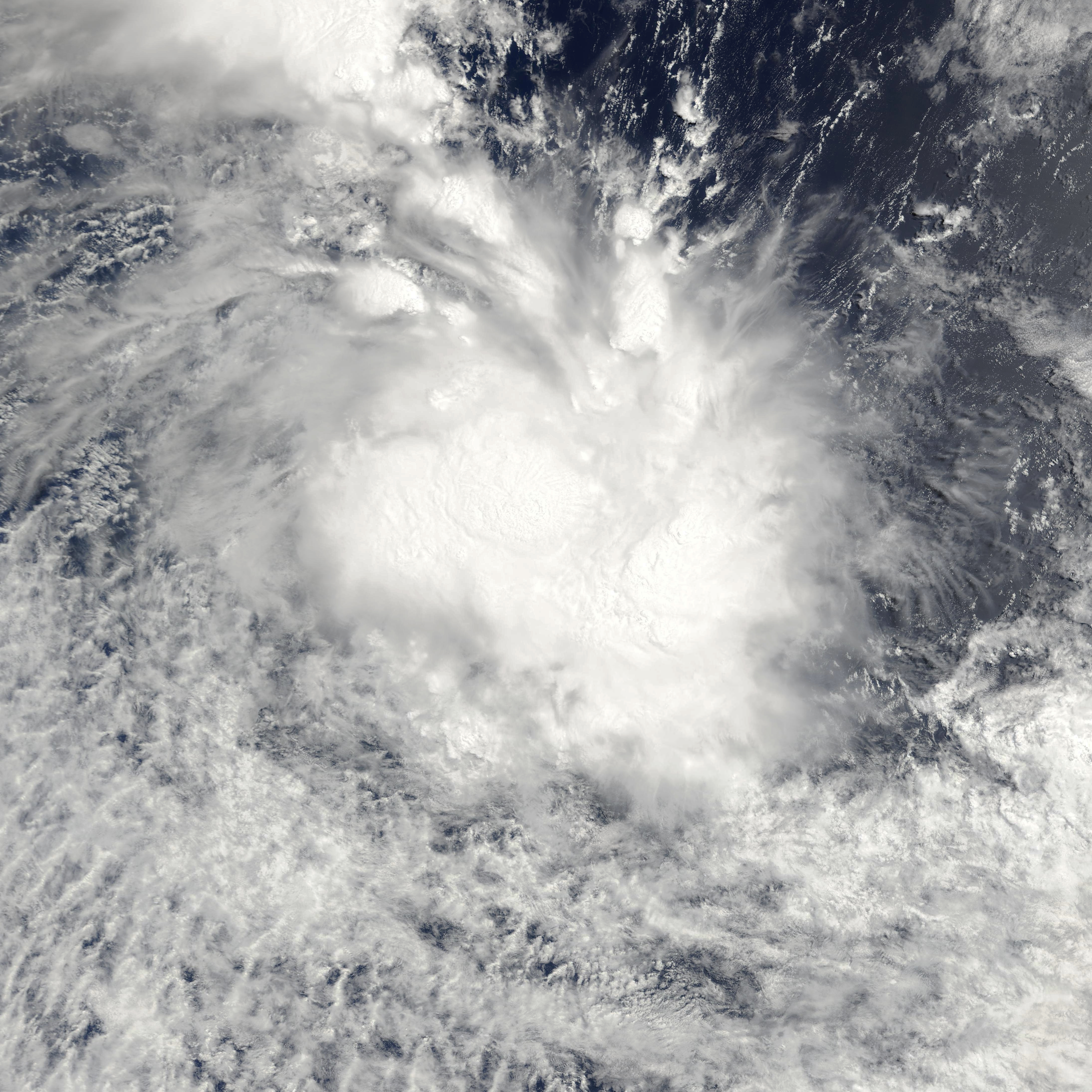
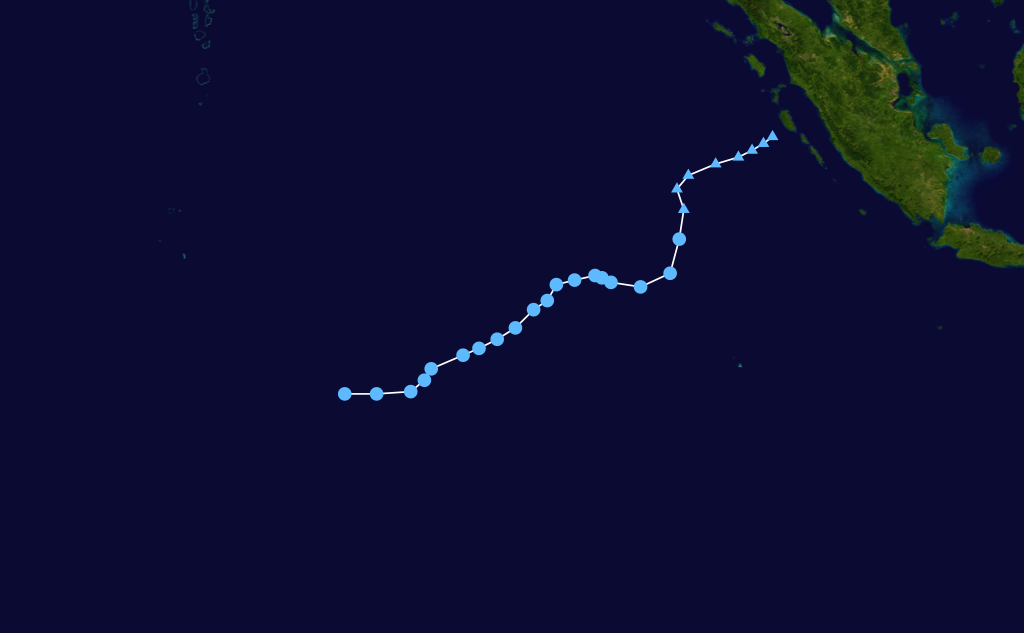
- Duration: September 18 – September 20
- Peak intensity: 35 km/h (25 mph) (10-min); 1008 hPa (mbar)

During September 17, both TCWC Jakarta and the JTWC reported that an area of convection had persisted about 740 km (460 mi), to the south east of Sumatra in Indonesia. Satellite imagery was showing that the convection was slowly starting to consolidate with a well defined low level circulation centre off the western coast of Sumatra. However it was not expected to develop any further due to being in area of high vertical wind shear in excess of 40 knots (74 km/h). Despite this it was designated as a tropical low early the next day by TCWC Perth. The JTWC then declared early the next day that the disturbance had dissipated as it crossed 90E and moved into RSMC La Réunion's area of responsibility. TCWC Perth continued to monitor the tropical low as it slowly developed further until early on September 20 when RSMC La Réunion designated it as the second Zone of Disturbed Weather of the 2009–10 as convection had developed over the system and the amount of vertical wind shear over the system had dropped. However, they released their final advisory later that day, as convection had dissipated in the northern quadrants of the system.

=== Tropical Disturbance 03 ===
- Tropical disturbance (MFR)
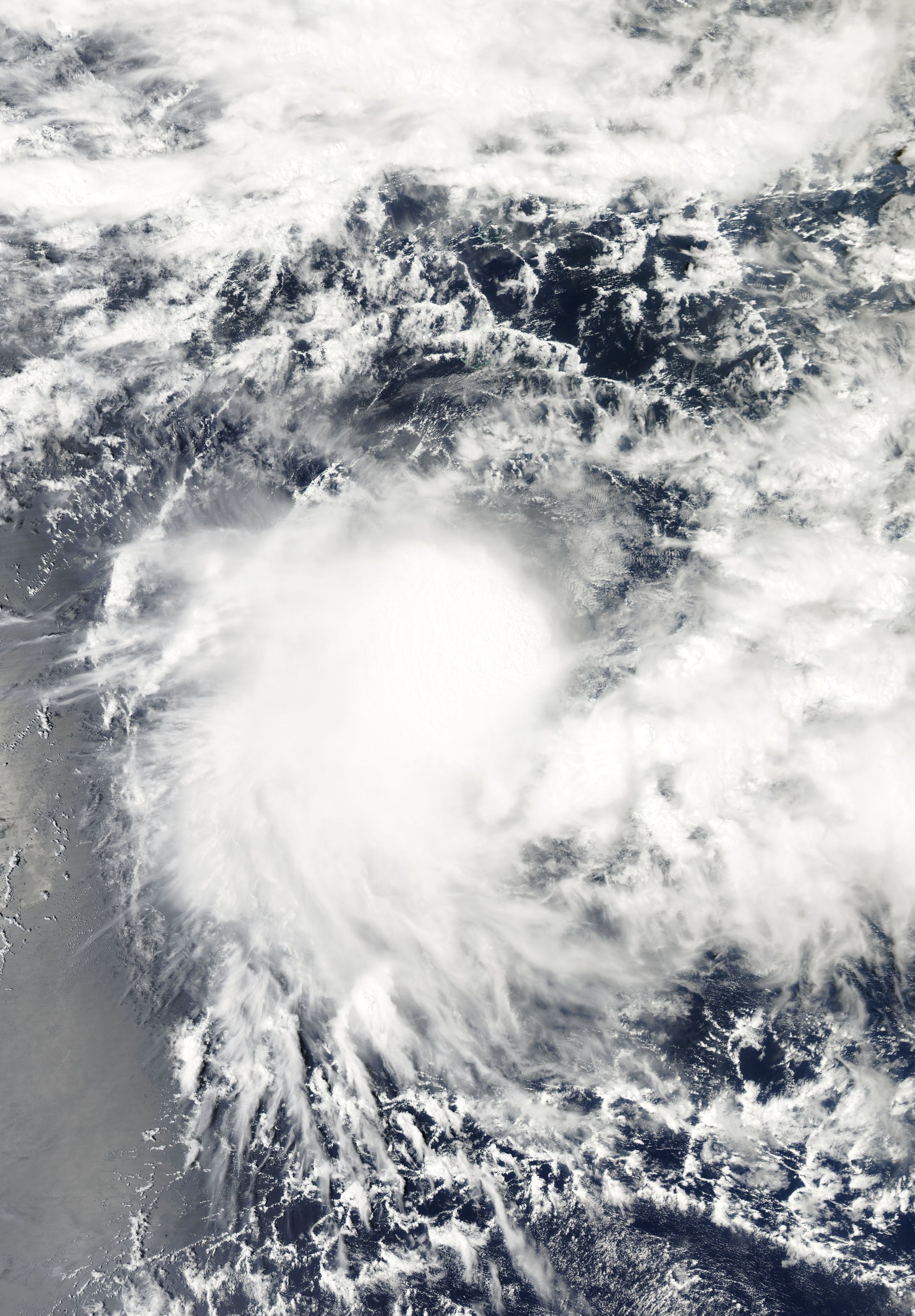
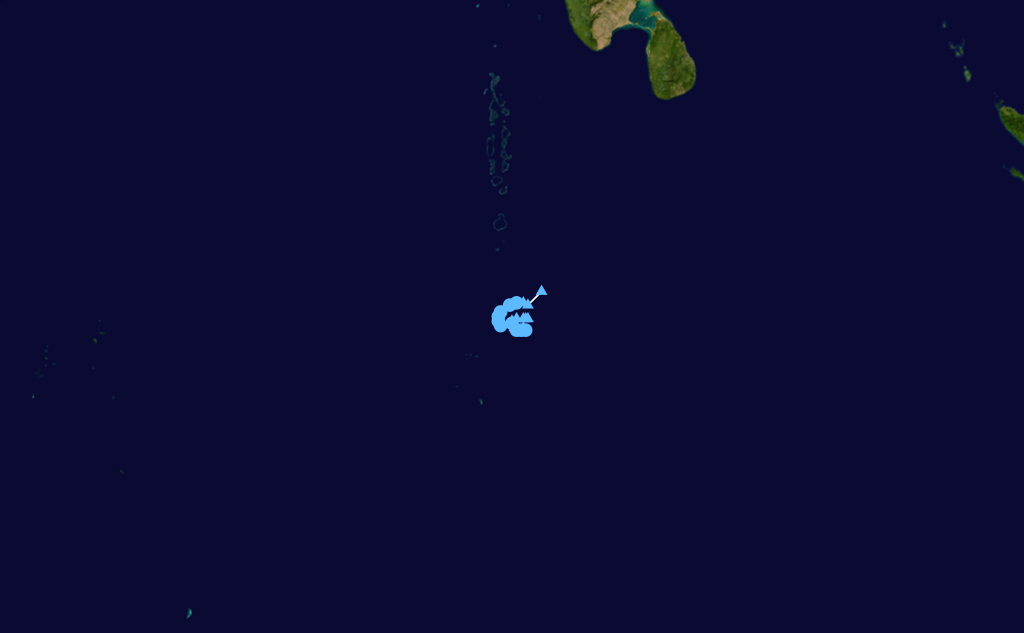
- Duration: November 7 – November 10
- Peak intensity: 45 km/h (30 mph) (10-min); 1002 hPa (mbar)

Early on November 7, the JTWC issued a Tropical Cyclone Formation Alert on a system north of Diego Garcia. Later that day, RSMC La Réunion upgraded the system to a tropical disturbance. Despite forecasts that the system would strengthen to a depression, it was substantially affected by shear, and as a result, the JTWC cancelled their TCFA on November 9.

=== Intense Tropical Cyclone Anja ===
- Intense tropical cyclone (MFR)
- Category 3 tropical cyclone (SSHWS)
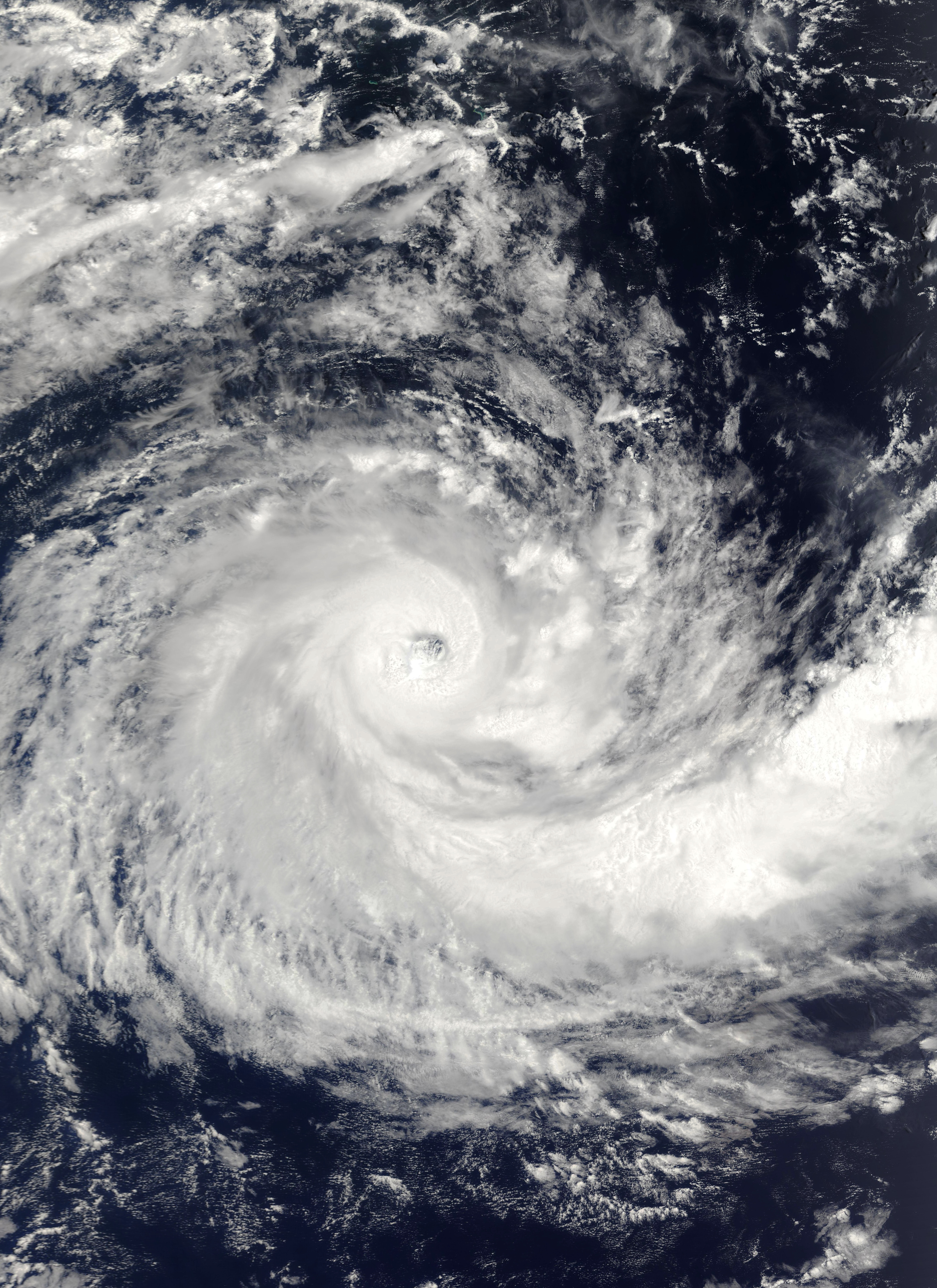
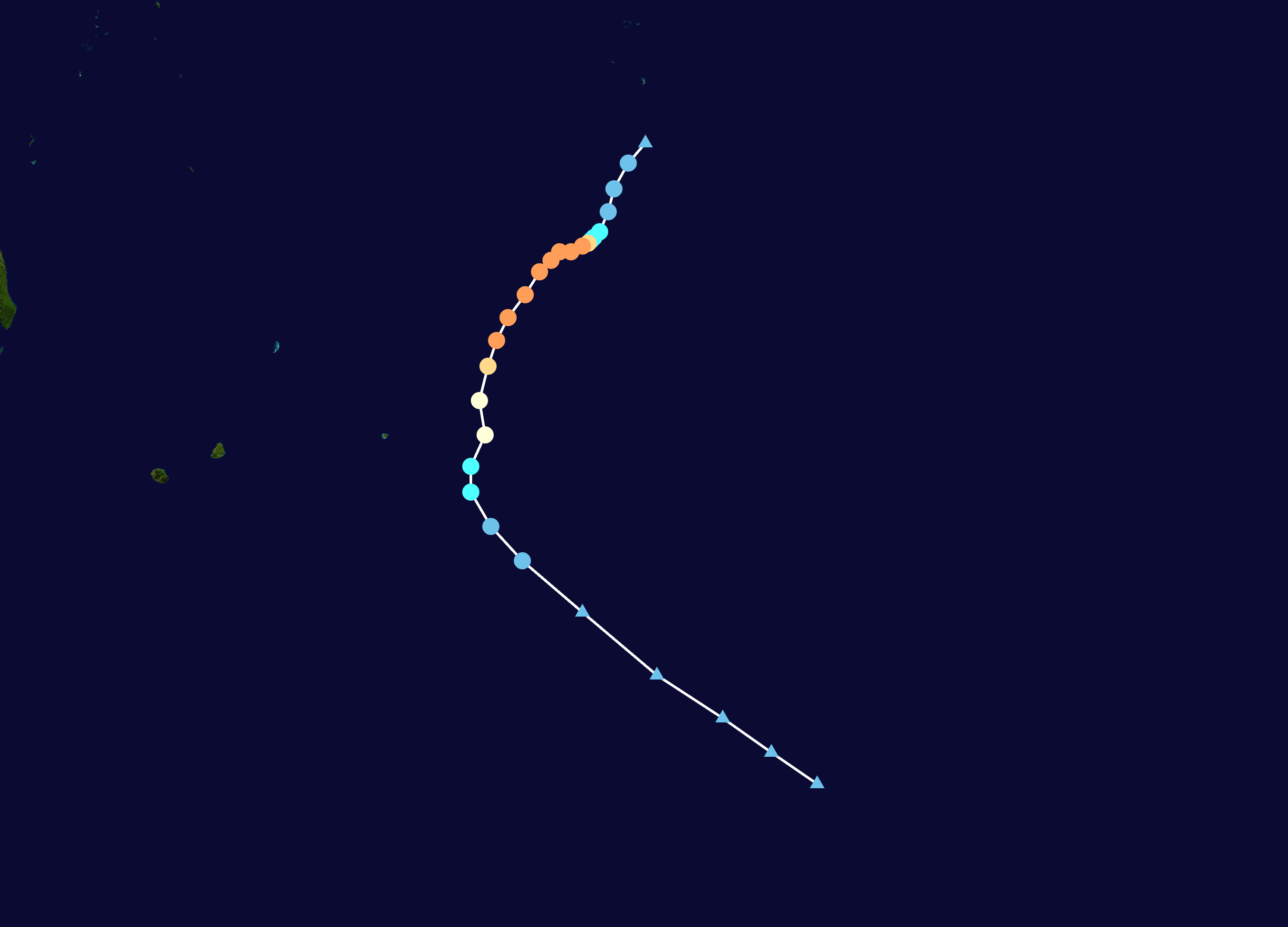
- Duration: November 13 – November 18
- Peak intensity: 165 km/h (105 mph) (10-min); 950 hPa (mbar)

RSMC La Réunion commenced advisories on Tropical Disturbance 04 on November 14, raising the status to a Tropical Depression later the same day. At the time of formation, it was some 390 mi (630 km) south of Diego Garcia. Throughout that day, and into the 15th, Anja rapidly intensified from a severe tropical storm to a tropical cyclone on the MFR scale and a Category 3-equivalent cyclone on the Saffir–Simpson hurricane scale (SSHS), while remaining well away from land. The system displayed annular characteristics and was very small; its diameter was 60 nautical miles (110 km) and it displayed a pinhole eye. The storm peaked at a Category 3-equivalent intensity and held its strength until November 17 when the storm rapidly weakened to a tropical storm. Final advisories were issued on November 18 as the system weakened to a depression and became extratropical.

=== Moderate Tropical Storm Bongani ===
- Moderate tropical storm (MFR)
- Tropical storm (SSHWS)
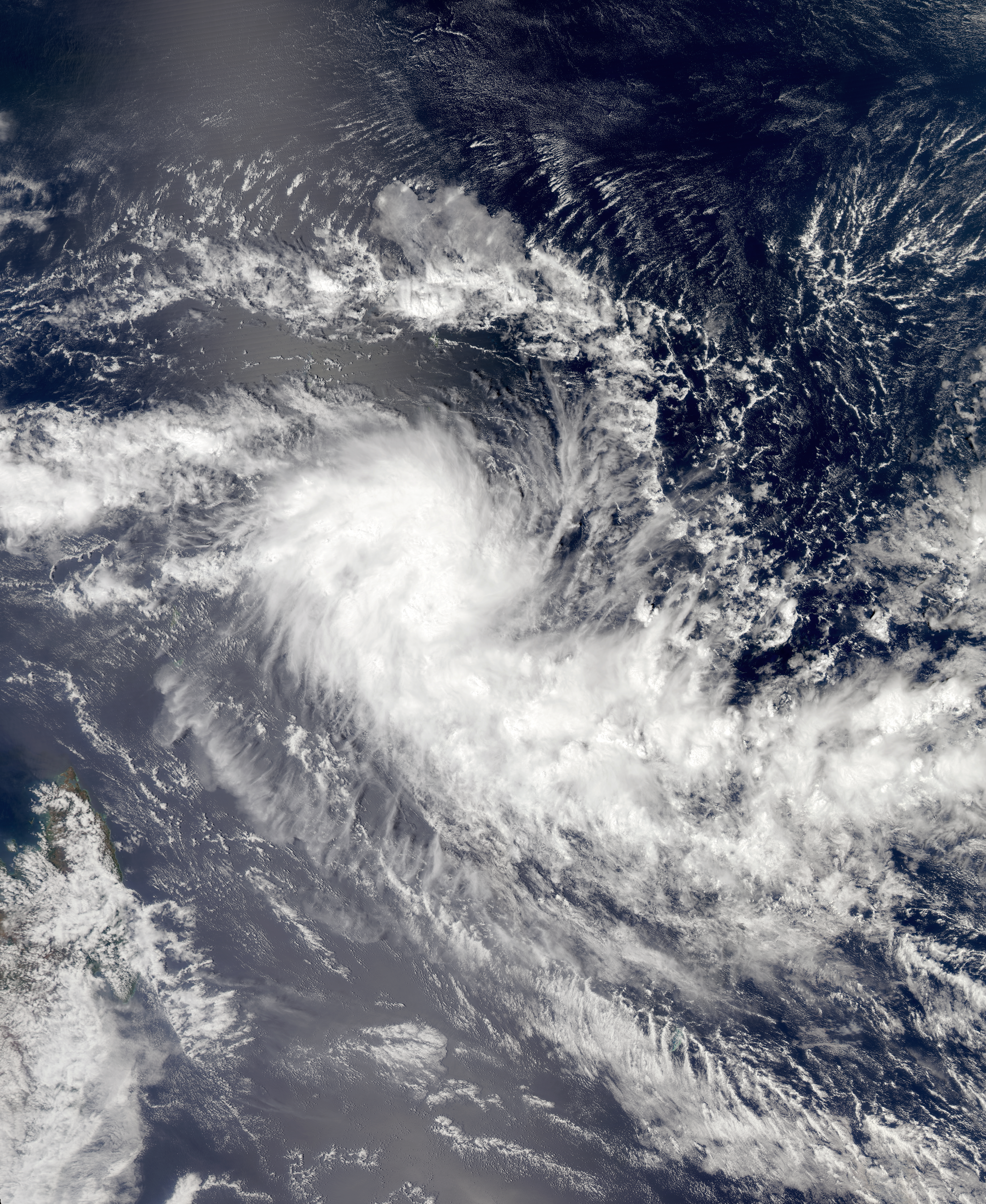
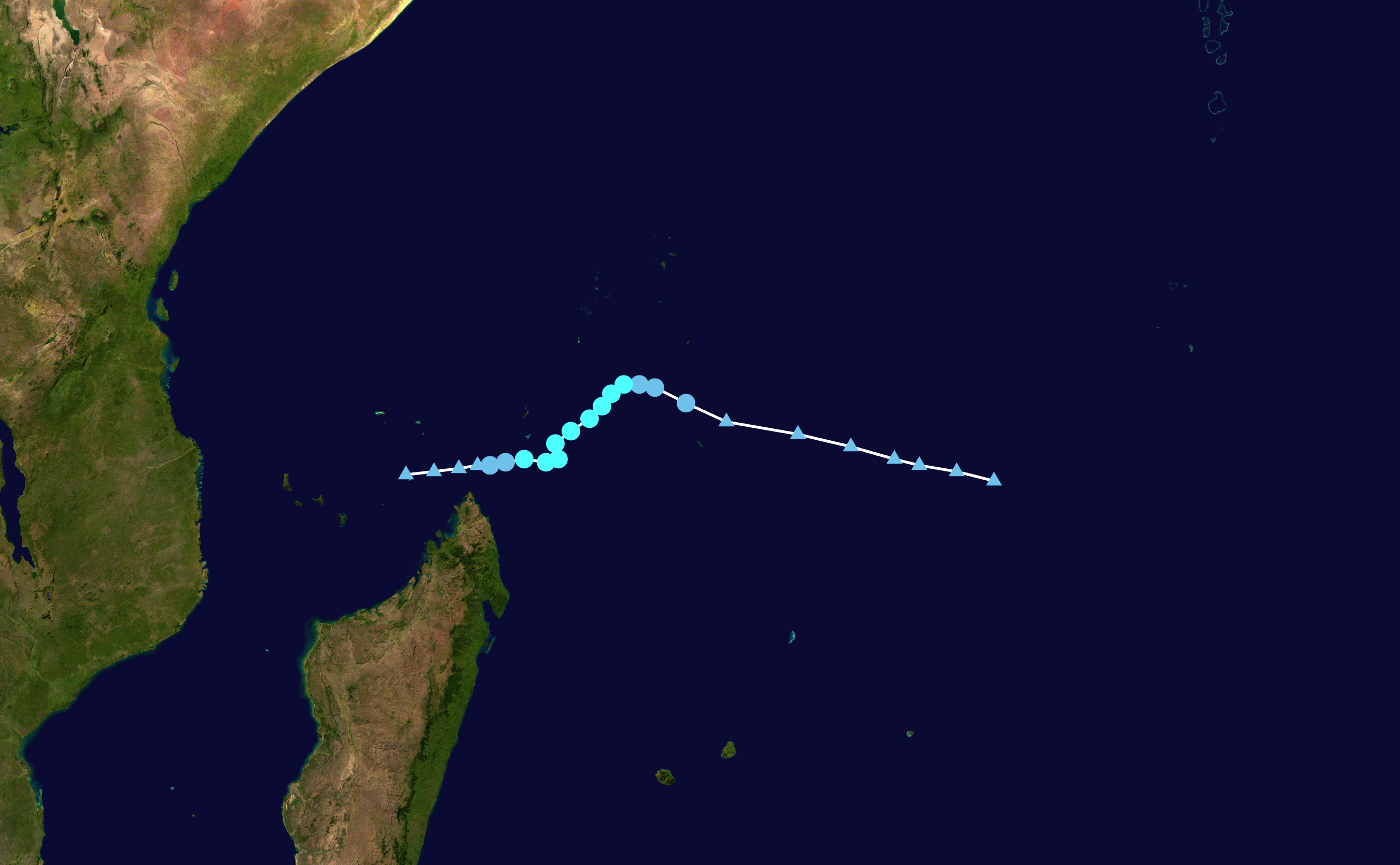
- Duration: November 22 – November 25
- Peak intensity: 75 km/h (45 mph) (10-min); 996 hPa (mbar)

On November 22, RSMC La Réunion commenced issuing advisories for Tropical Disturbance 05 about 500 mi (800 km) northeast of Madagascar. The next day it strengthened to a Moderate Tropical Storm and was named 'Bongani'. On November 23–24, the system remained small sized and was undergoing a temporarily southeasterly constraint. According to CIMSS data (MIMIC-TPW), the dry air that was to the southwest of the system interfered with circulation of the system and temporarily limited the intensification rate. On the morning of November 24, Bongani rapidly weakened into a tropical disturbance.

The remnants of Bongani brought unsettled weather to the Mayotte Islands. Moderate rains affected the region between November 26 and 27; waves associated with the storm also averaged 3 m (9.8 ft) along coastal areas with some reaching 6 m (20 ft). In the nearby Comoros Islands, waves were similarly high, with the highest reaching 5 m (16 ft).

=== Intense Tropical Cyclone Cleo ===
- Intense tropical cyclone (MFR)
- Category 4 tropical cyclone (SSHWS)
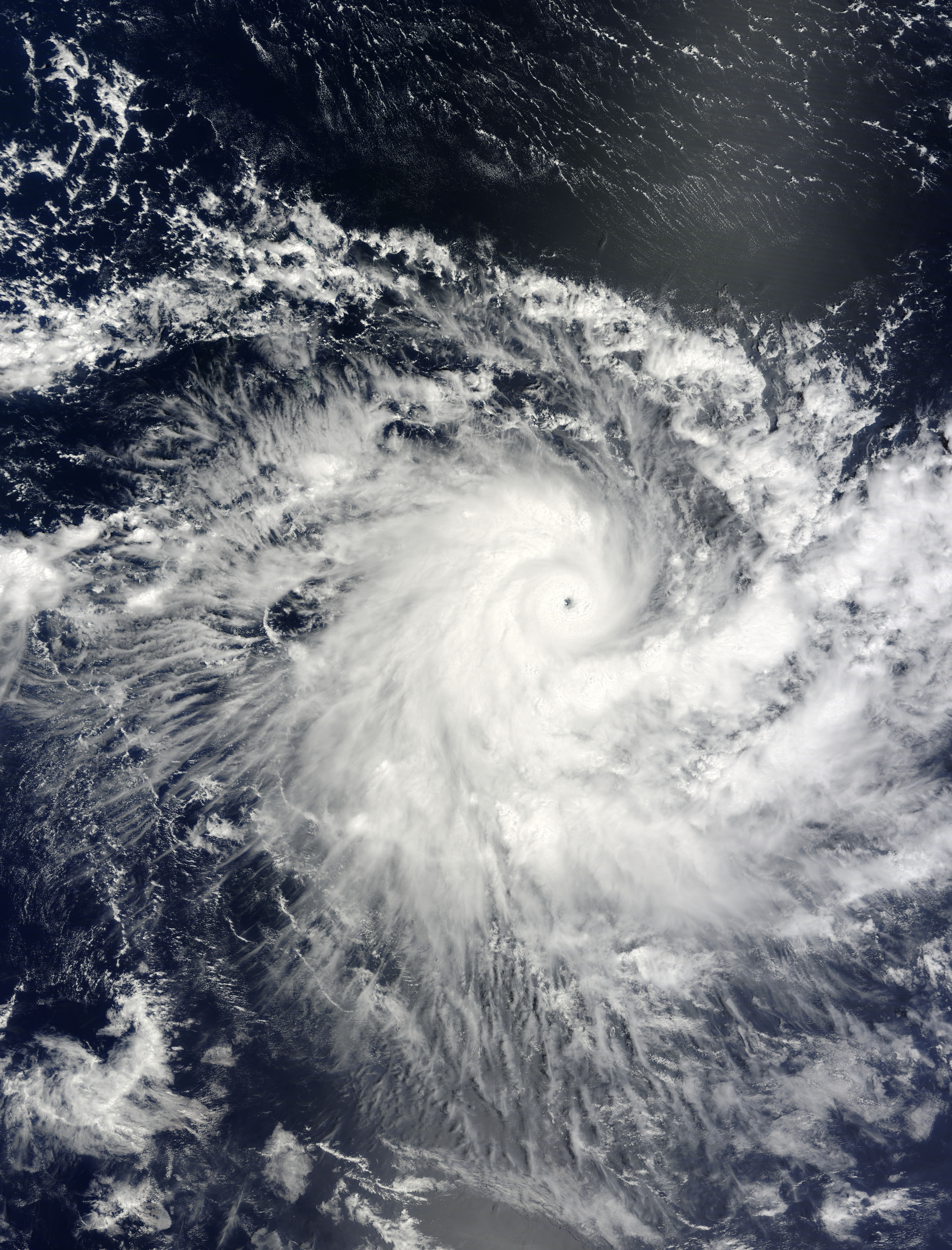
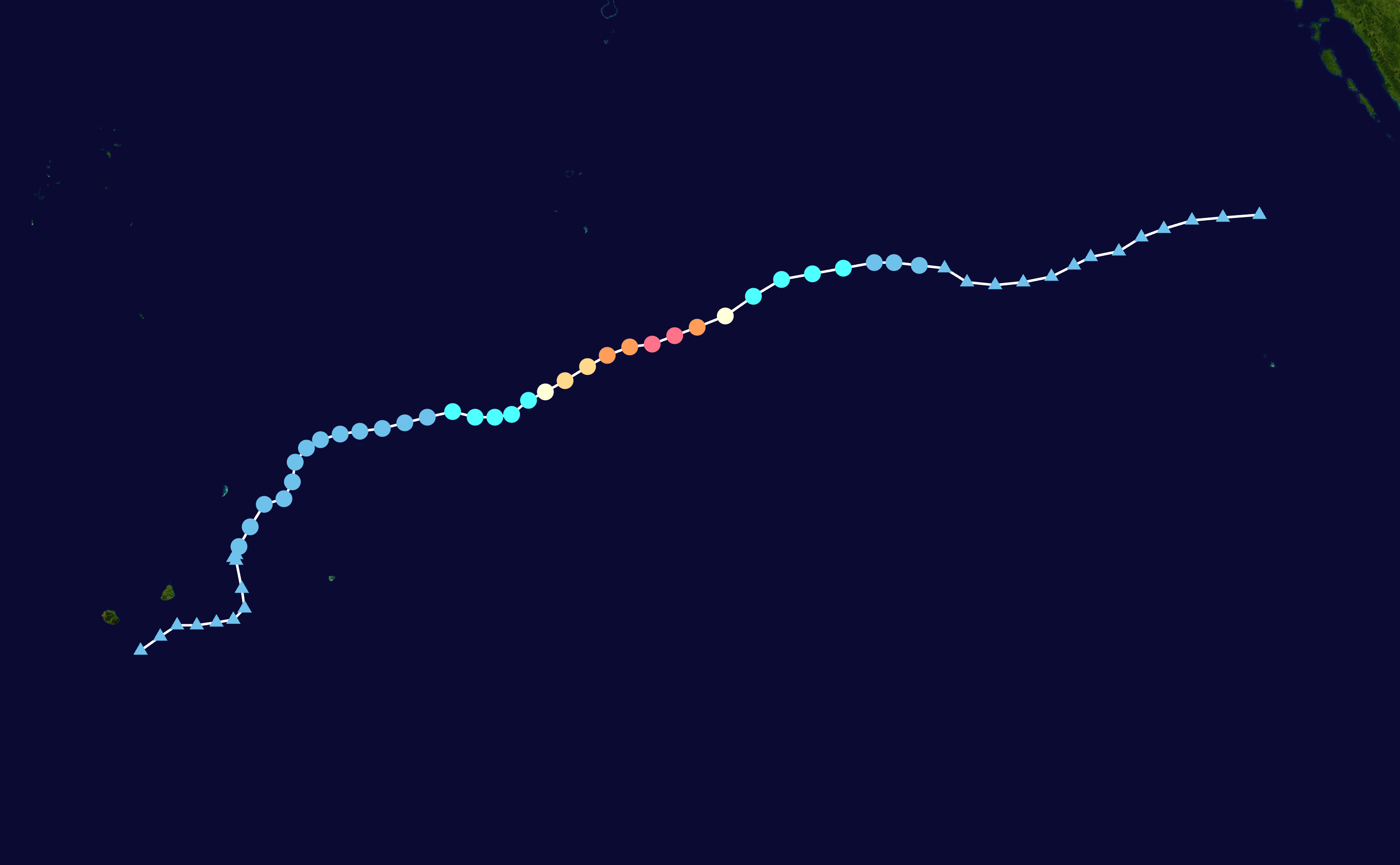
- Duration: December 6 – December 14
- Peak intensity: 195 km/h (120 mph) (10-min); 930 hPa (mbar)

On December 6, a strong tropical disturbance 06 newly formed in the central Indian Ocean. The storm was expected to strengthen slowly, however, the next day, the disturbance strengthened into a severe tropical storm while being given a designation as Tropical Cyclone 03S by the JTWC. On 8 December it strengthened rapidly to become the first Intense Tropical Cyclone of the season and a Category 4-equivalent cyclone on the Saffir–Simpson hurricane scale (SSHS). It sustained this strength for a day peaked at a Category 4-equivalent intensity and held its strength as a high strong category 4-equivalent, then on the 10th slowly weakened to a category 2 equivalent cyclone. The weakening continued steadily, and the final advisory was issued on December 12 when the remnants were 370 miles (600 km) north of Rodrigues. Later that day, the remnants of Ex-Cleo regenerated to a tropical depression, but it weakened to a tropical disturbance and dissipated on December 14.

=== Moderate Tropical Storm David ===
- Moderate tropical storm (MFR)
- Tropical storm (SSHWS)
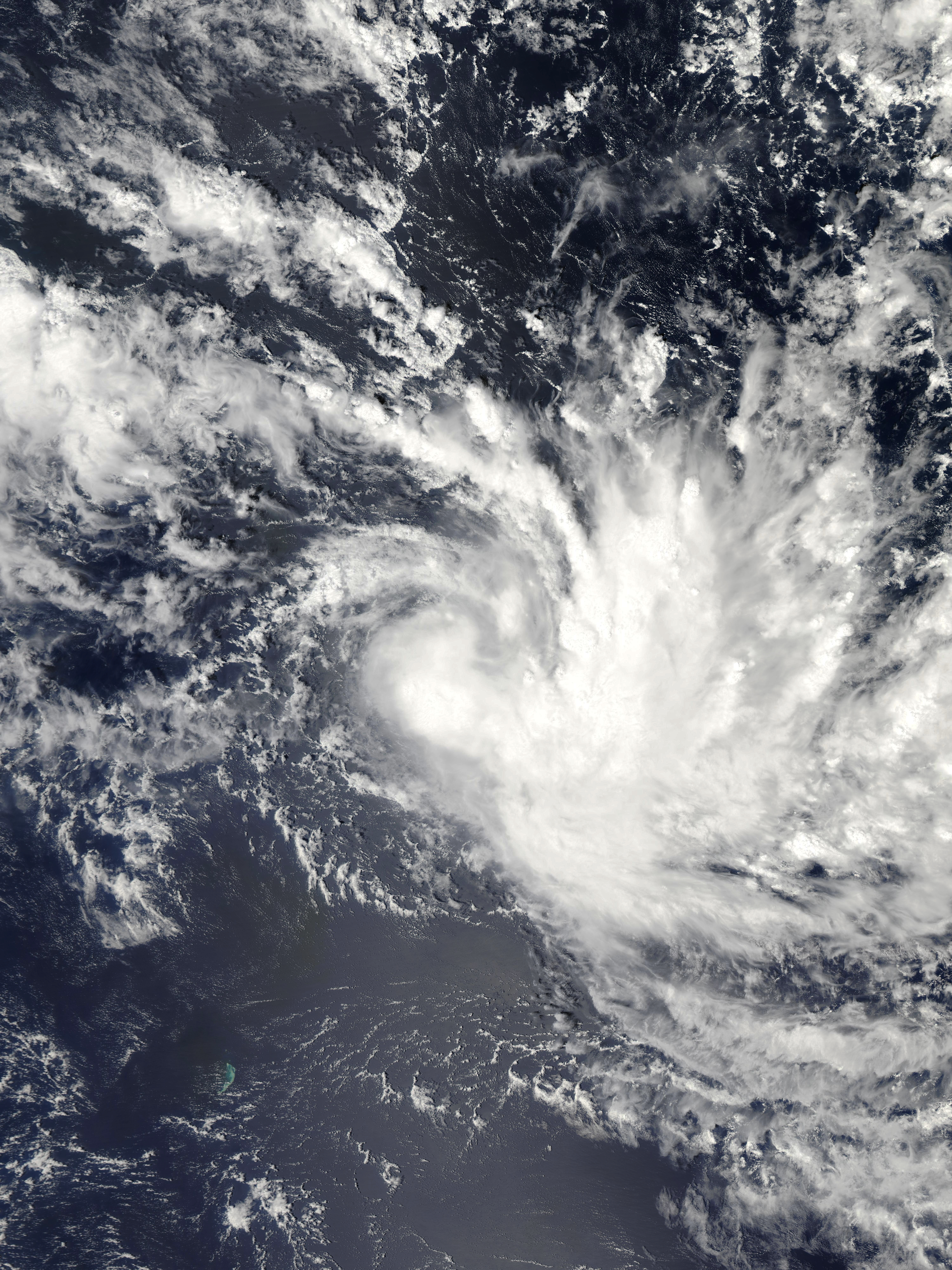
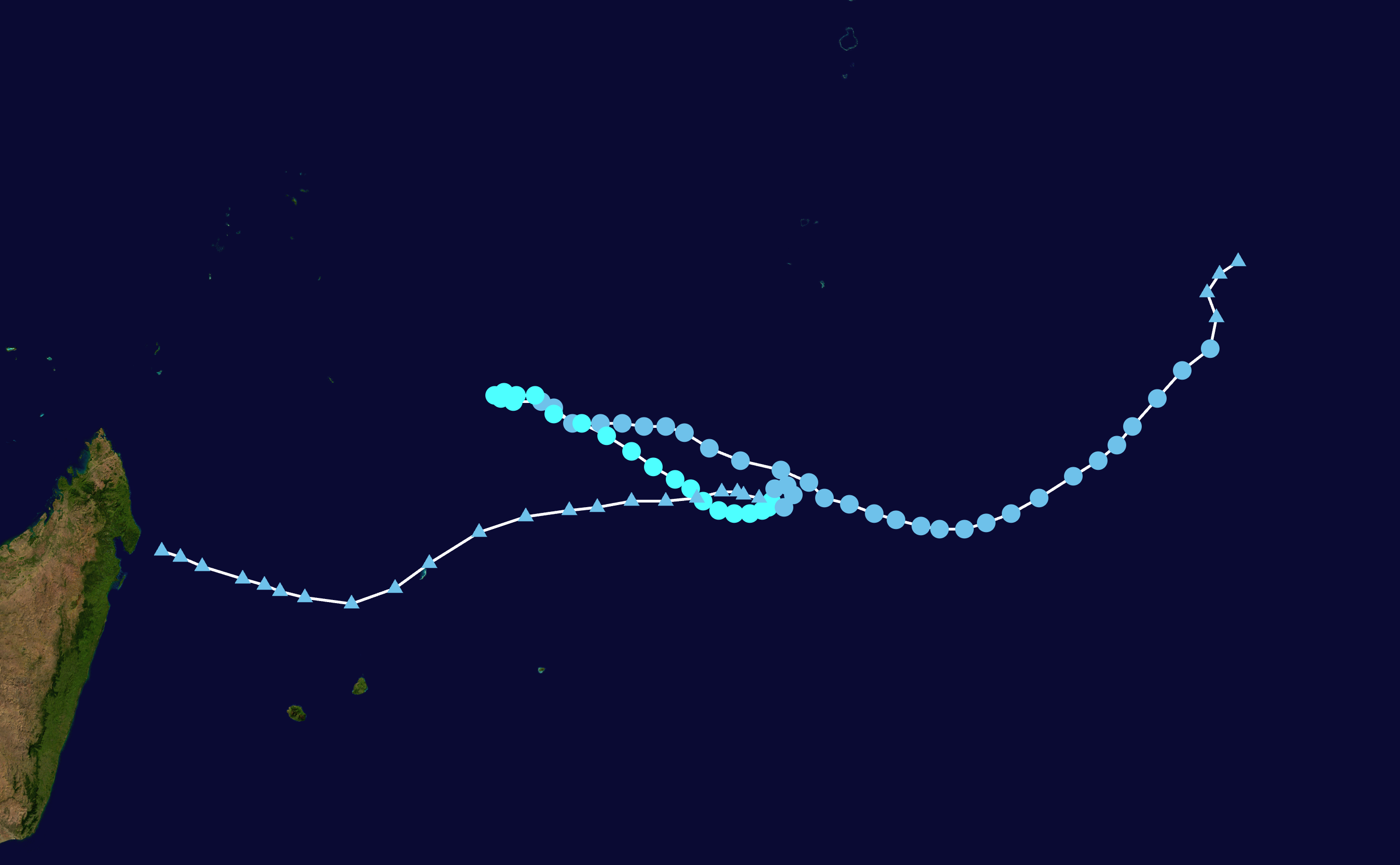
- Duration: December 12 – December 25
- Peak intensity: 85 km/h (50 mph) (10-min); 987 hPa (mbar)

On December 12, a zone of disturbed weather formed in the Southern Indian Ocean near the border with the Australian region. The next day the RSMC classified it as Tropical Disturbance 07, and JTWC as Tropical Cyclone 05S, but its movement to cooler water and higher levels of wind shear weakened the tropical system on the 14th. The remnants continued to show a Low level Circulation Centre accompanied by flaring convection as they headed west or northwest, and the organisation began to improve again on the 19th. It continued to organize throughout the next day, and by the 21st of December it was named Moderate Tropical Storm David by the Mauritius Meteorological Service. It then reversed its direction of motion and headed east-southeast while strengthening to a Severe Tropical Storm. Its strength fluctuated for the next few days, and by Christmas Day it was moving very little and windshear weakened it to a Tropical Disturbance. The final advisory from the RSMC was issued on December 25, although the remnant continued to produce bursts of poorly organized convection for several days as it reversed direction again and headed west.

In post-season analysis, David was downgraded to a Moderate Tropical Storm as winds were reassessed to have never exceeded 85 km/h (55 mph).

On December 29, the remnants of David brought heavy rain to the islands of Mauritius and Réunion. Most of Mauritius recorded over 100 mm (3.9 in) of rain within a 24-hour span, with a maximum of 146.2 mm (5.76 in) in Mon Loisir Rouillard. Widespread flash flooding took place across the island, resulting in over 20 calls to firefighters for rescue. Officials deployed special mobile forces in several cities due to the risk of increased flooding.

=== Very Intense Tropical Cyclone Edzani ===
- Very intense tropical cyclone (MFR)
- Category 5 tropical cyclone (SSHWS)
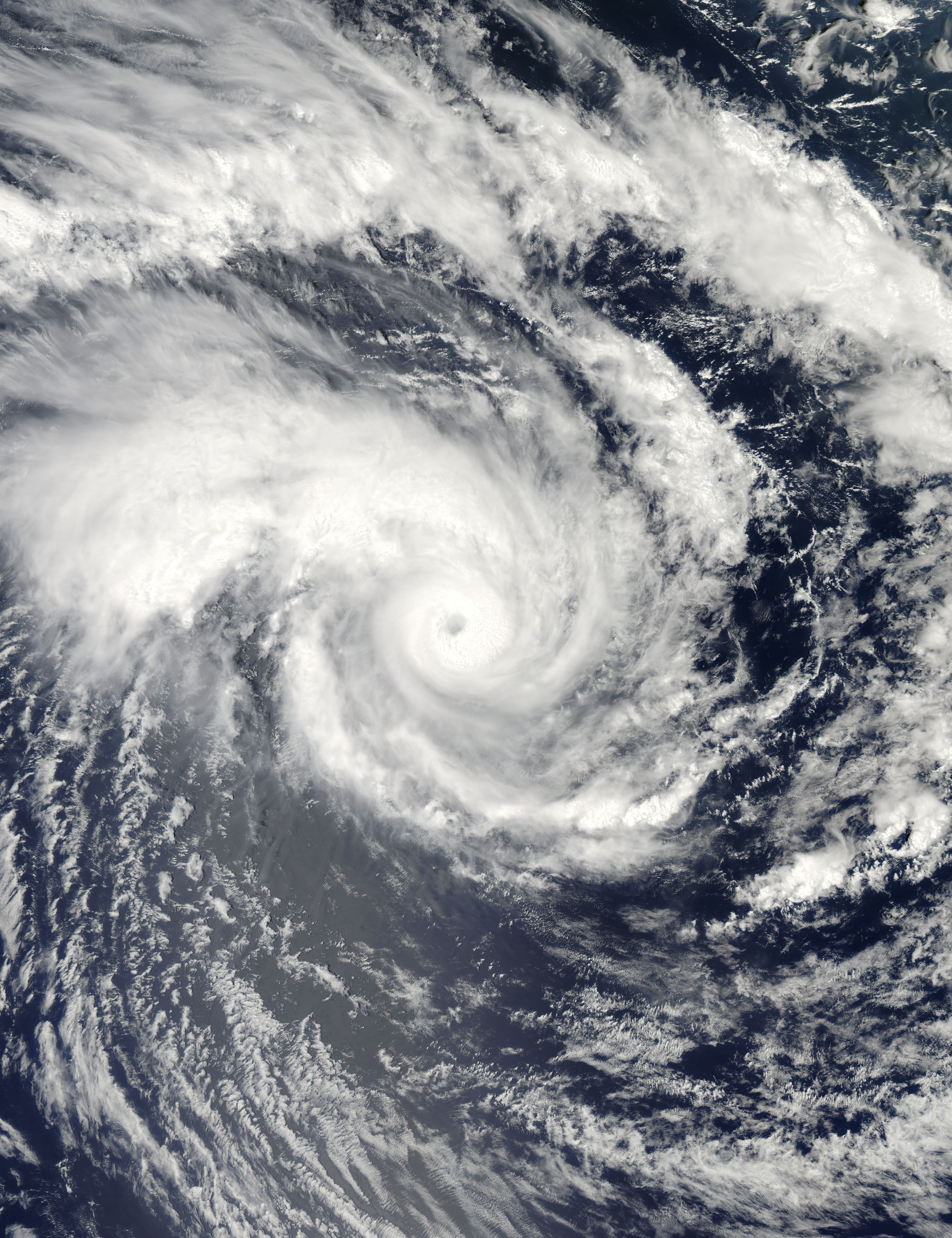
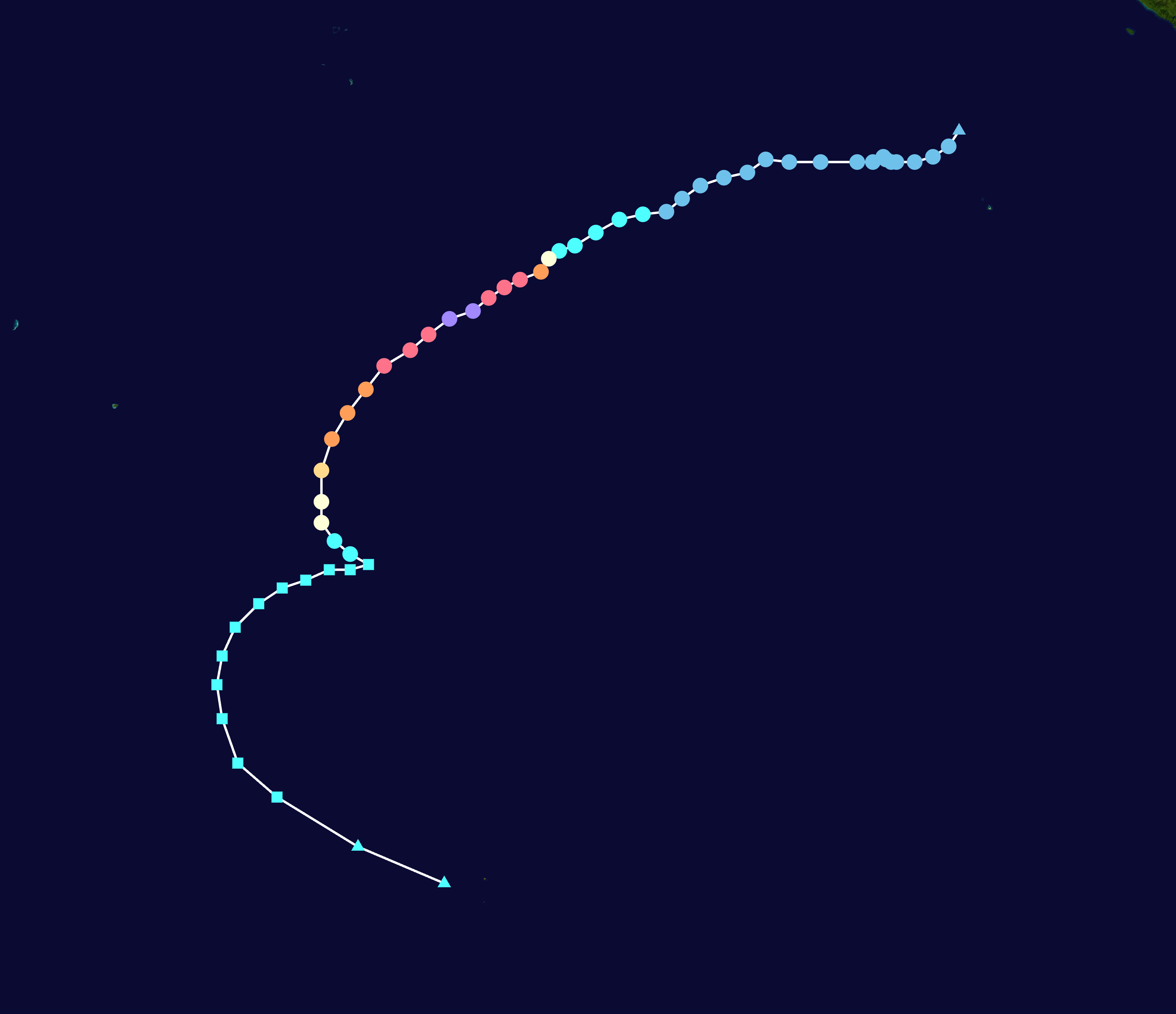
- Duration: January 4 (Entered basin) – January 14
- Peak intensity: 220 km/h (140 mph) (10-min); 910 hPa (mbar)

Tropical Low 03U of the Australian Region crossed the 90ºE meridian on 4 January and was designated Tropical Disturbance 8 by RSMC La Réunion. The system showed two low-level circulation centres for a while, but on 5 January these consolidated, and the combination was upgraded to a Tropical Depression. At 0300 UTC on January 6, the JTWC starts issuing advisories designating the system as 07S, and shortly thereafter the RSMC upgraded it to Moderate Tropical Storm Edzani. Early on January 7, RSMC La Réunion upgraded Edzani to a Severe Tropical Storm, and it strengthened rapidly throughout the day to become an Intense Tropical Cyclone. The next day it became a Very Intense Tropical Cyclone and category 5 (1 min 260 kmh) by JTWC, the first since Juliet in April 2005. On January 9, Edzani was downgraded to an Intense Tropical Cyclone due to decreasing sea surface temperatures. It continued to weaken during the day, as sea surface temperatures continued to decrease. By January 10, it was only a Tropical Cyclone, and within the next few days it weakened to Moderate Tropical Storm strength. The RSMC classified it as a subtropical cyclone by January 12, although JTWC treated it as tropical for 2 days longer.

=== Tropical Disturbance 09 ===
- Tropical disturbance (MFR)
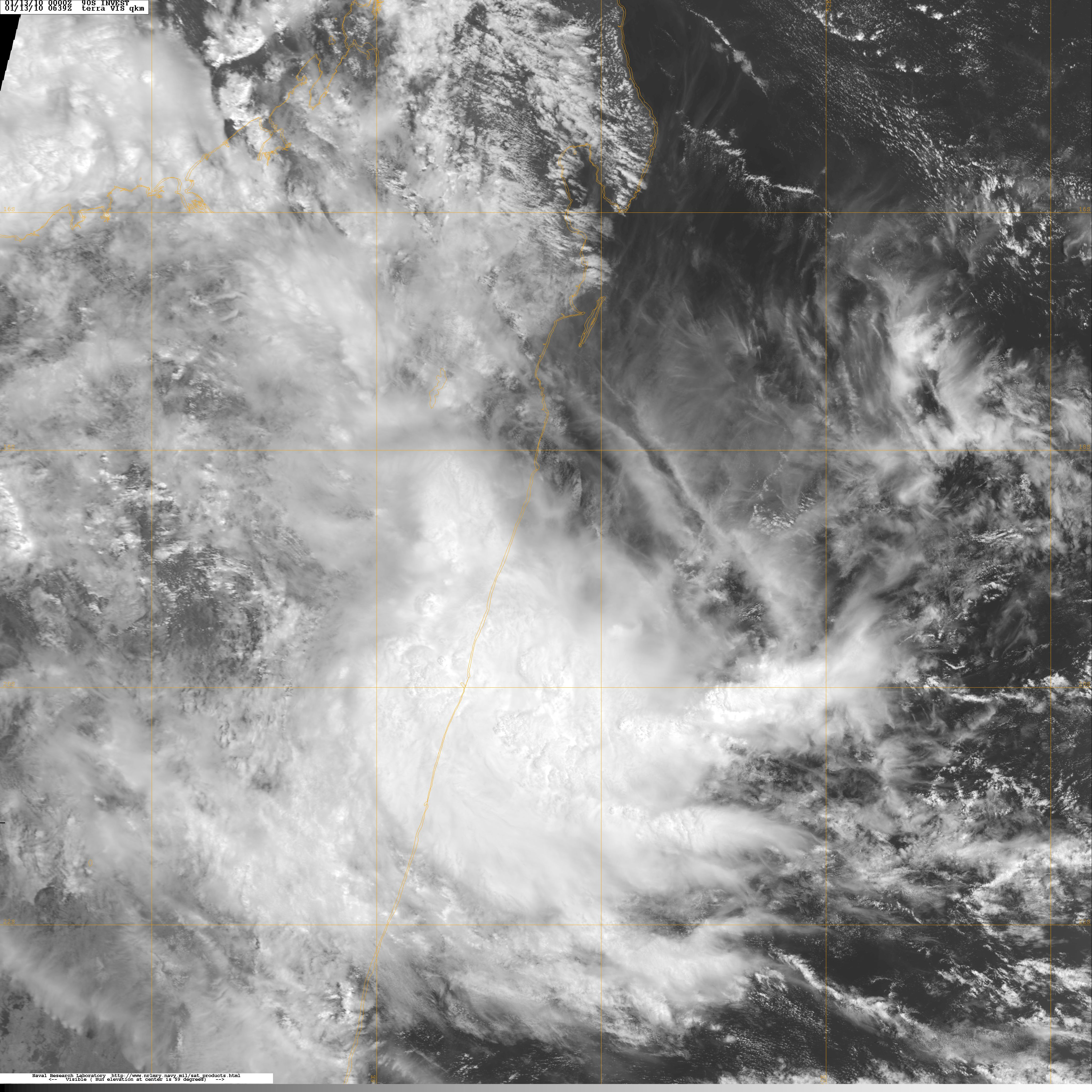
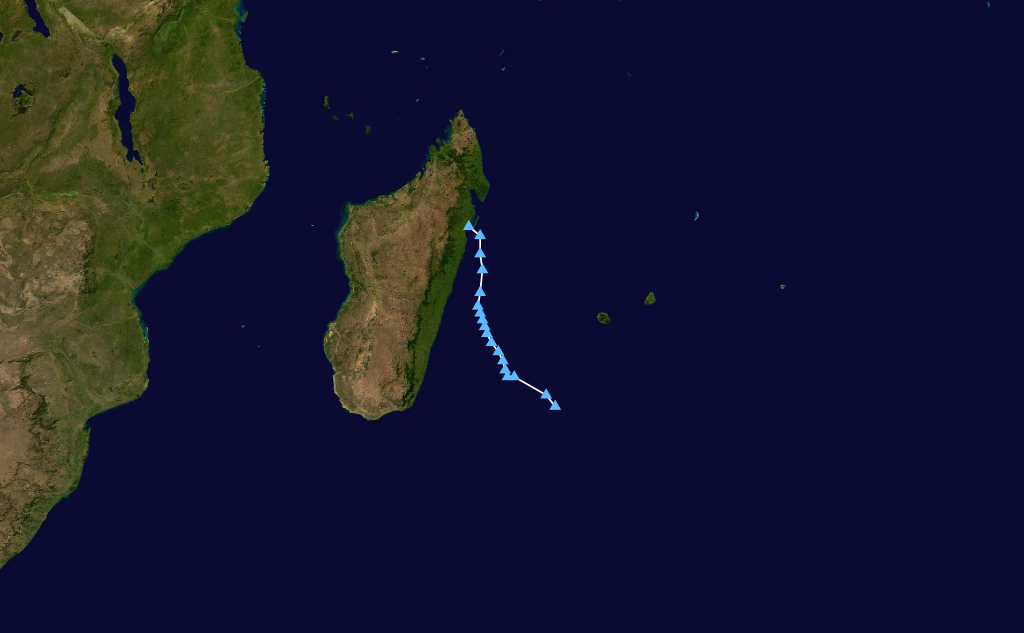
- Duration: January 15 – January 16
- Peak intensity: 45 km/h (30 mph) (10-min); 1005 hPa (mbar)

An area of disturbed weather, first observed over the Mozambique Channel around 8 January, moved across northern Madagascar and into the Indian Ocean where it displayed occasional bursts of convection. On 15 January the LLCC improved in organisation, and the RSMC designated it as a Tropical Disturbance 245 nmi (454 km) to the west-southwest of La Réunion. The next day, RSMC La Réunion issued their final advisory on the system as the center was ill-defined.

=== Subtropical Depression 10 ===
- Subtropical depression (MFR)
- Tropical storm (SSHWS)
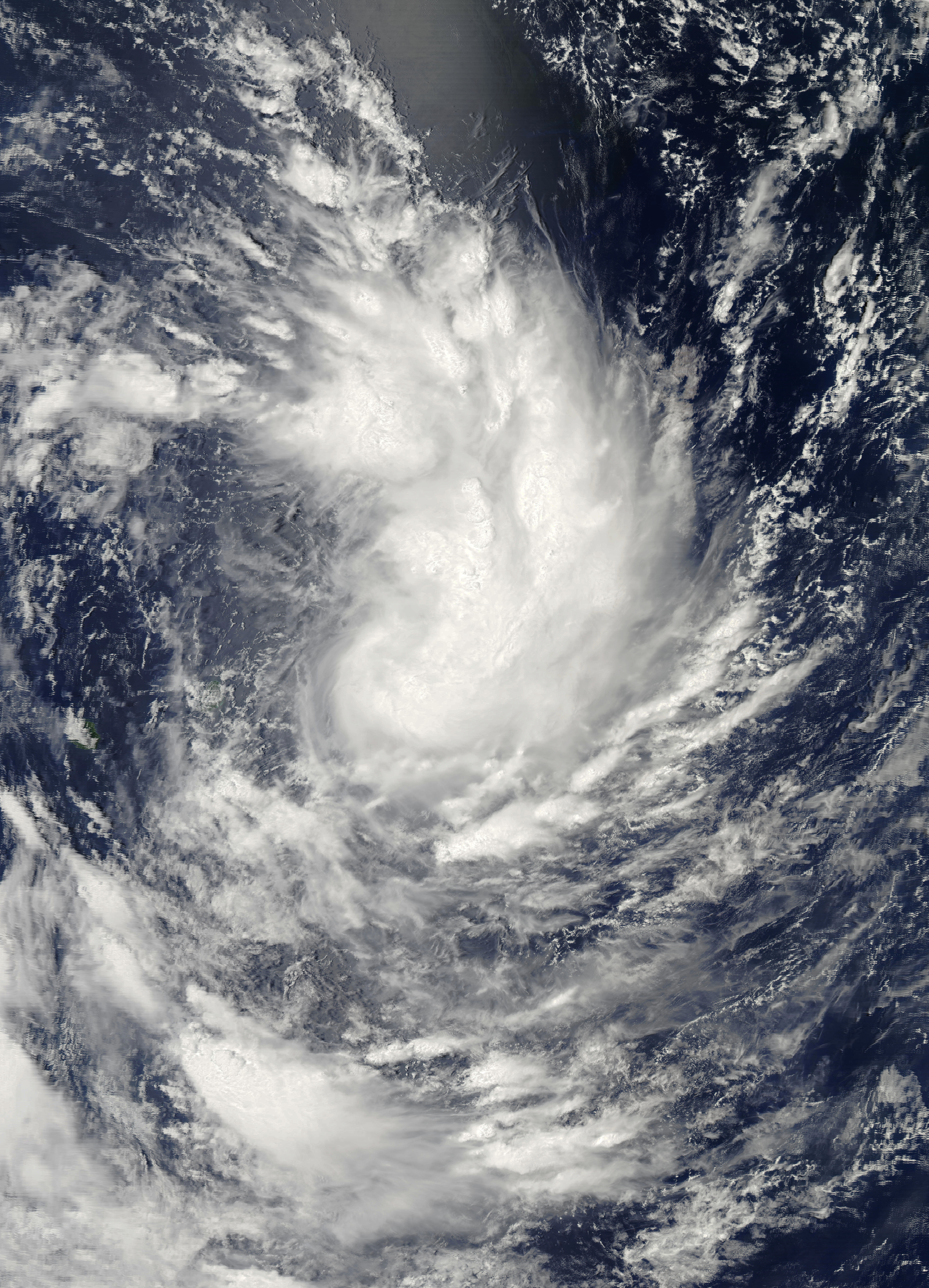
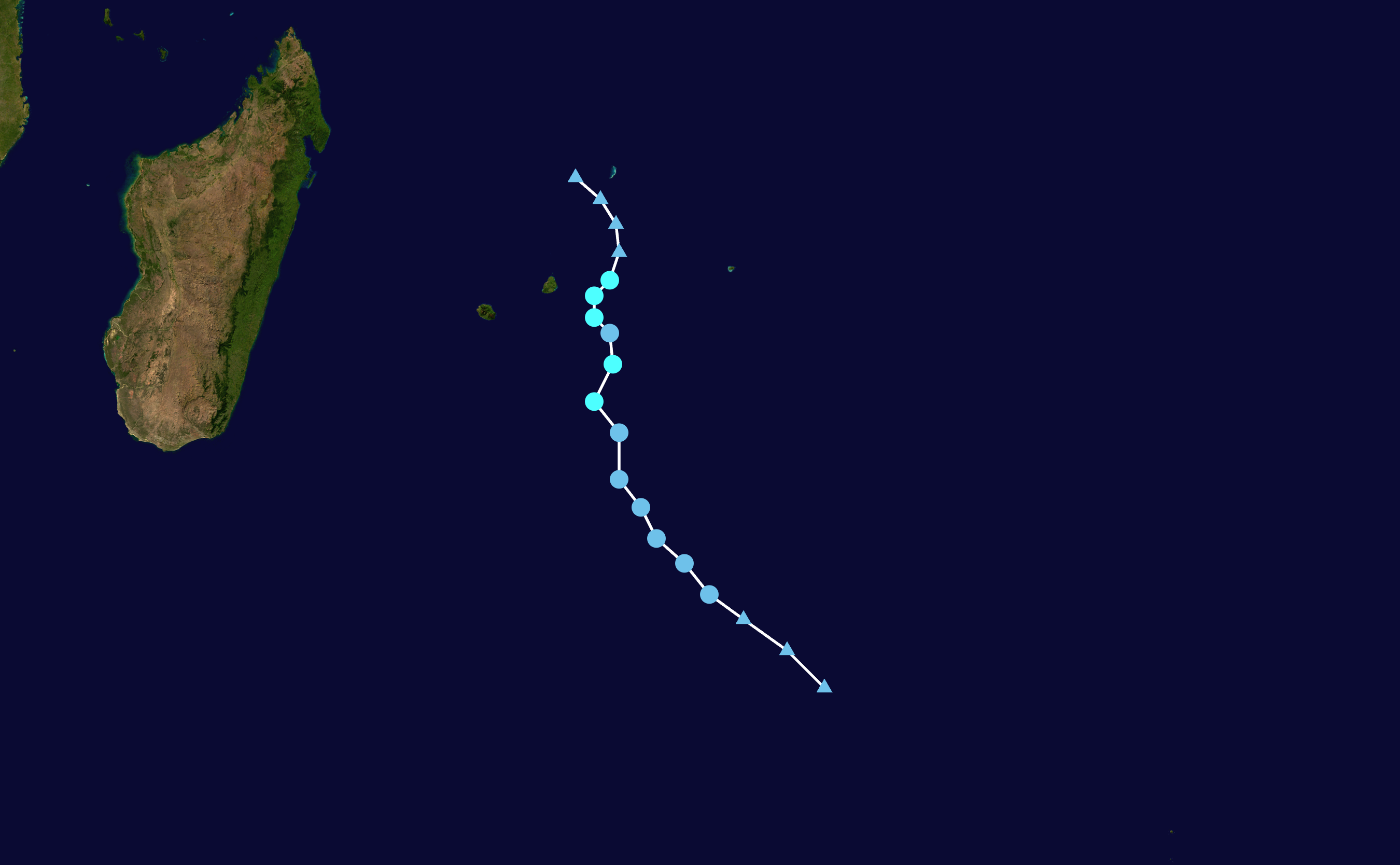
- Duration: January 25 – January 31
- Peak intensity: 65 km/h (40 mph) (10-min); 995 hPa (mbar)

On January 26, RSMC La Réunion announced that a Zone of Disturbed Weather had formed about 350 miles (560 km) NNE of Mauritius. Next day this was raised to a Tropical Disturbance, and JTWC designated is as Tropical Cyclone 11S based on 1-minute wind strength. By January 29 it displayed hybrid characteristics and was classified as a subtropical depression, although the maximum winds reached storm strength.

=== Moderate Tropical Storm Fami ===
- Moderate tropical storm (MFR)
- Tropical storm (SSHWS)
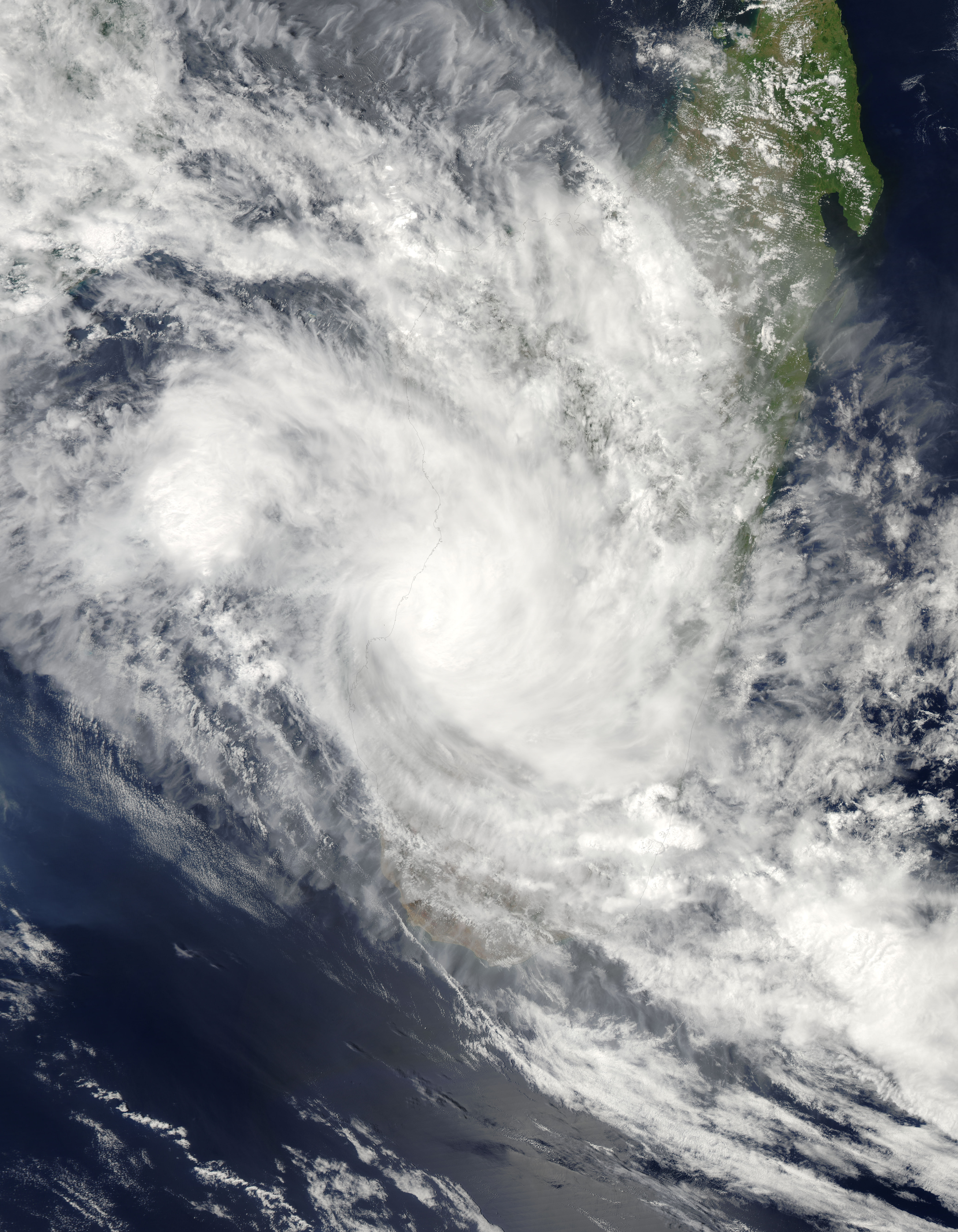
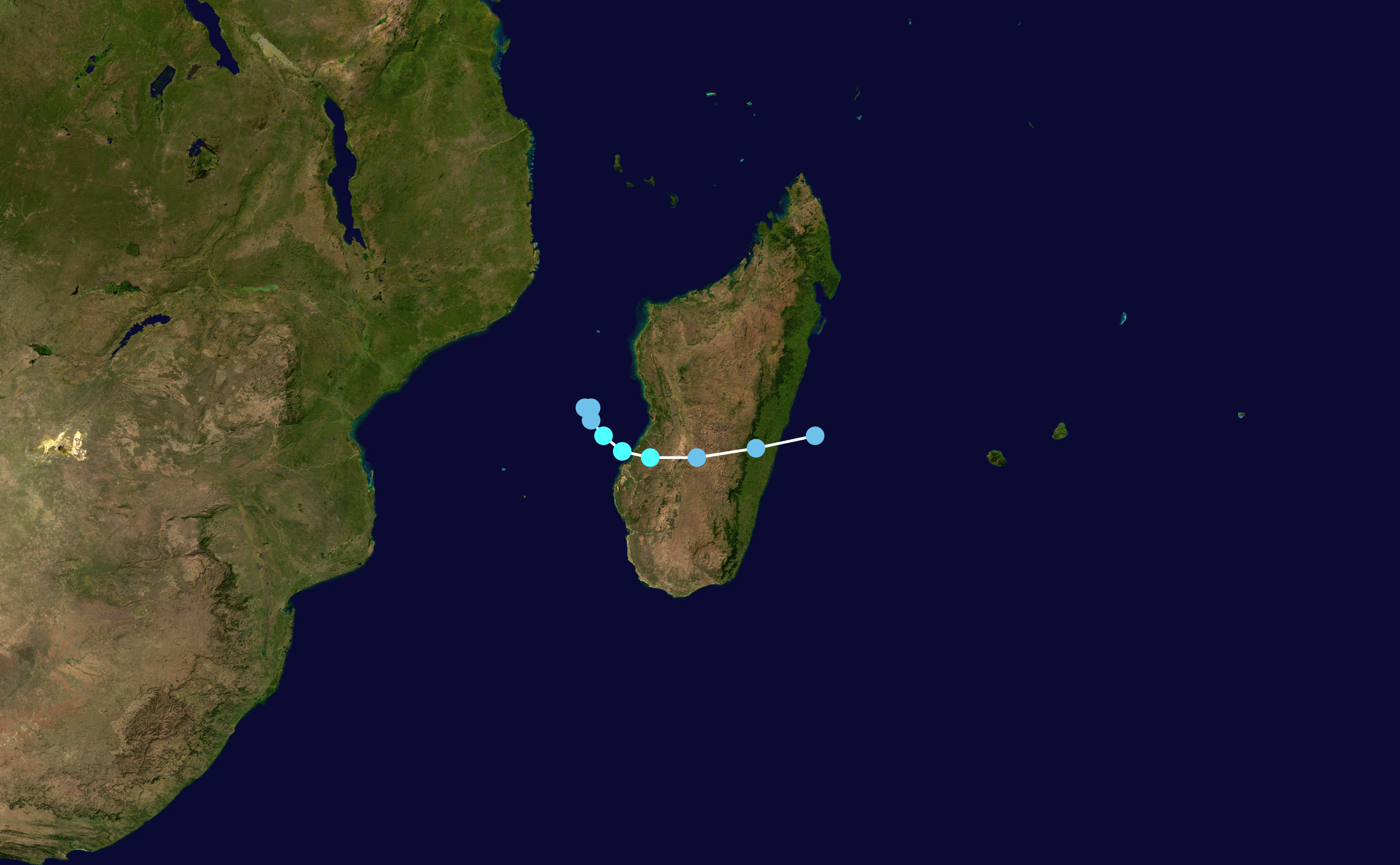
- Duration: February 1 – February 3
- Peak intensity: 85 km/h (50 mph) (10-min); 990 hPa (mbar)

On February 1, RSMC La Réunion commenced issuing advisories for Tropical Disturbance 11 in the Mozambique Channel. On February 2 it strengthened to a Moderate Tropical Storm and was named Fami. Shortly after this it made landfall on the western Malagasy coast and weakened rapidly to a depression. Fami dissipated on February 2.

=== Intense Tropical Cyclone Gelane ===
- Intense tropical cyclone (MFR)
- Category 4 tropical cyclone (SSHWS)
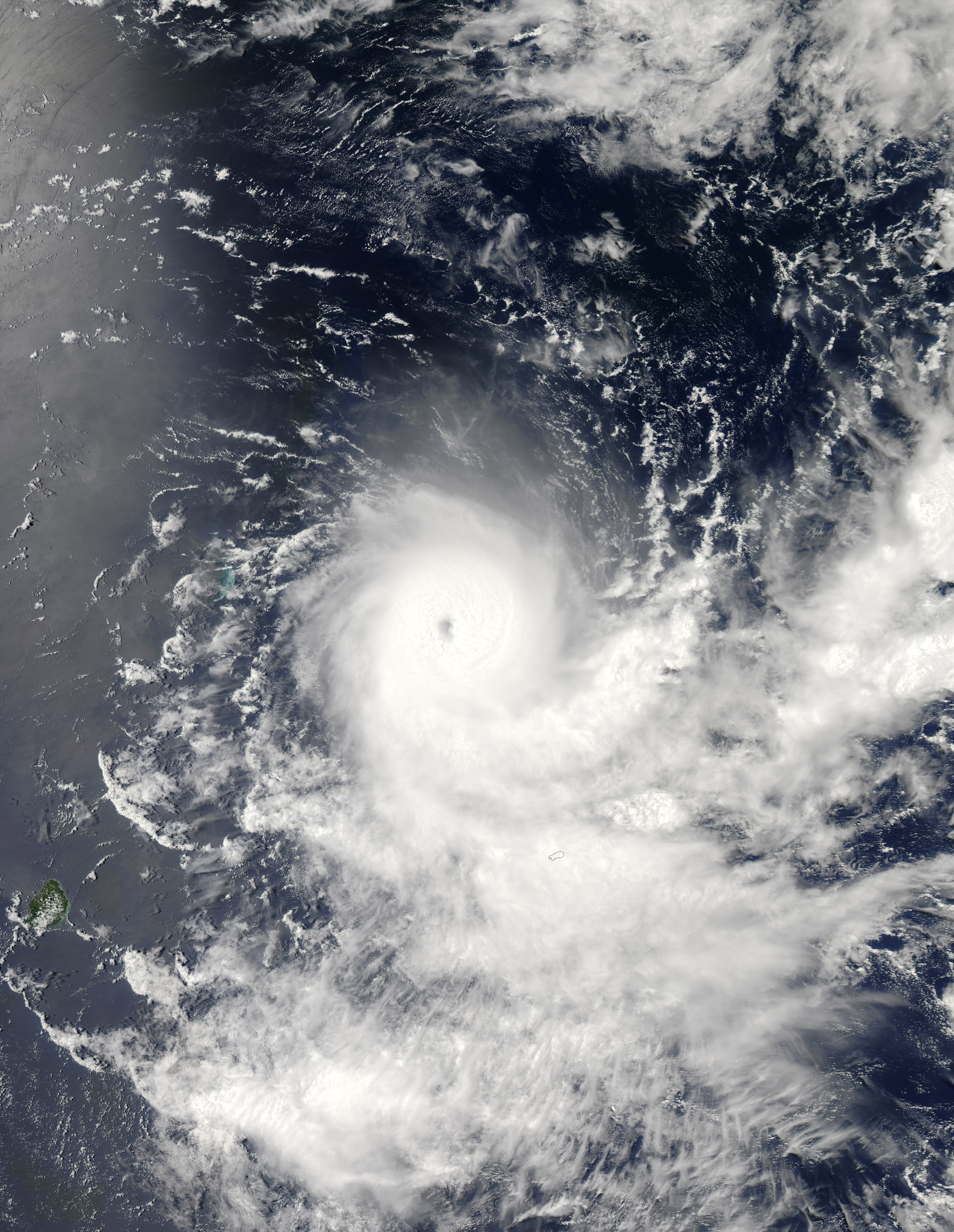
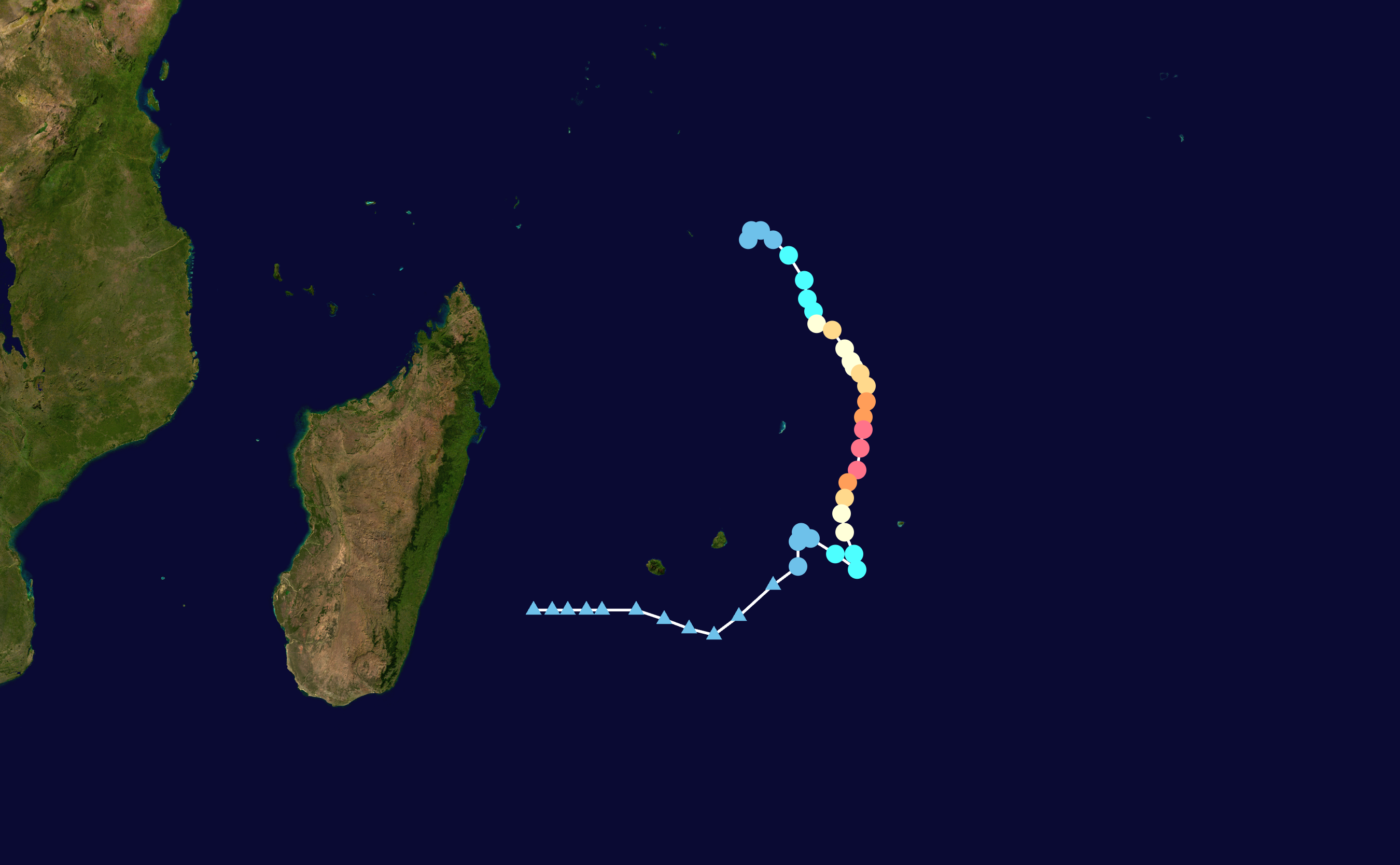
- Duration: February 15 – February 22
- Peak intensity: 205 km/h (125 mph) (10-min); 930 hPa (mbar)

On February 15, the RSMC announced the formation of Tropical Disturbance 12 approximately 650 nmi (1,200 km) NNE of La Réunion. Hours later it was classified as Moderate Tropical Storm Gelane. It reached Tropical Cyclone strength briefly on February 17, but quickly weakened to a Severe Tropical Storm. Then on February 18, it restrengthened back into a Tropical Cyclone, eventually becoming an Intense Tropical Cyclone. It remained a small system and weakened rapidly as wind shear effects increased.

=== Severe Tropical Storm Hubert ===
- Severe tropical storm (MFR)
- Tropical storm (SSHWS)
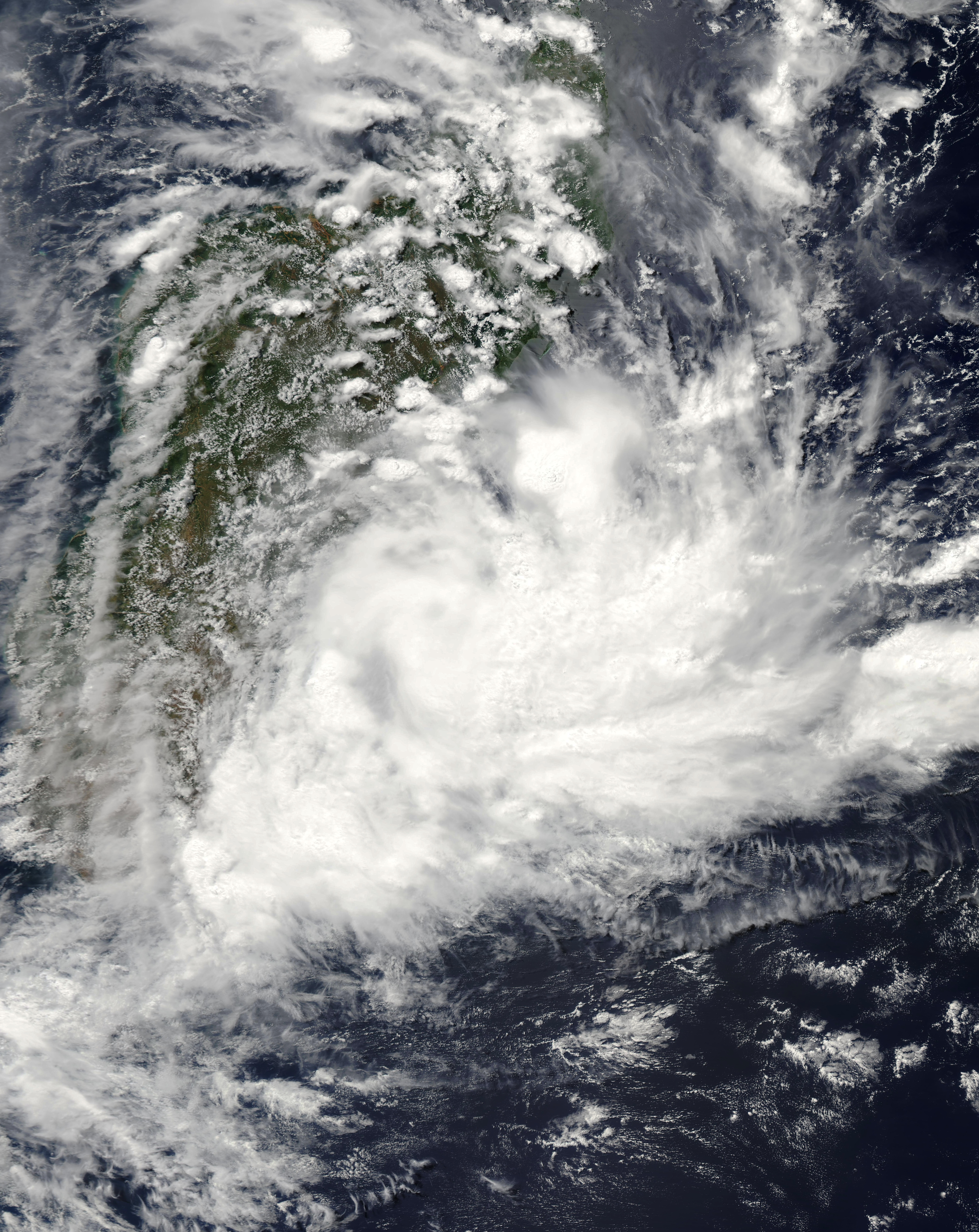
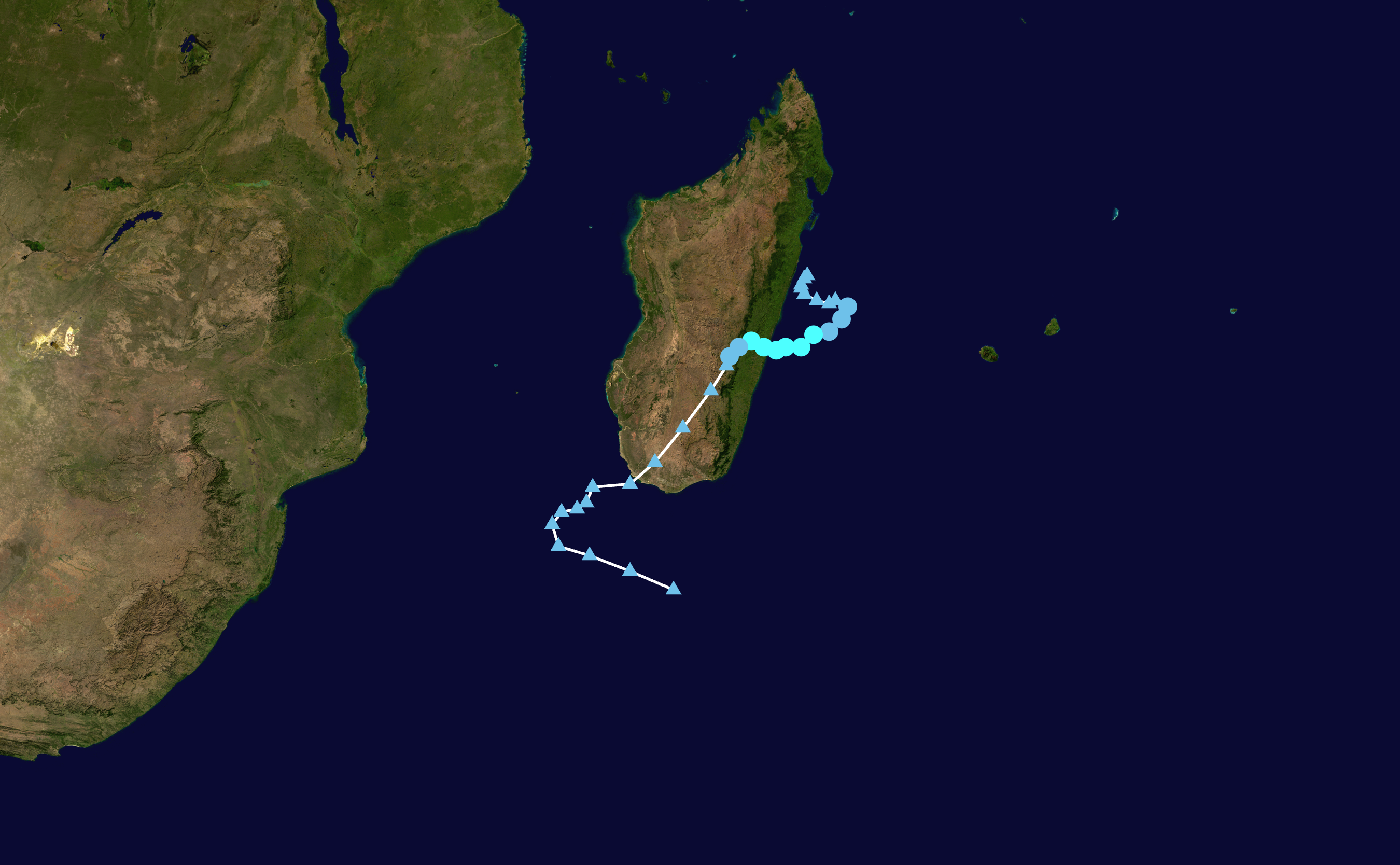
- Duration: March 7 – March 15
- Peak intensity: 100 km/h (65 mph) (10-min); 985 hPa (mbar)

On March 9, a tropical disturbance formed between Madagascar and Réunion. On March 10 it strengthened to a tropical storm and was named Hubert by the meteorological service of Madagascar. It strengthened to a severe tropical storm as it approached the Madagascar coast, and made landfall north of Mananjary. At least ten people were killed by the storm and 32,000 others were affected throughout Madagascar. Later reports confirmed that four other people had been killed and two more were missing. Nearly 38,000 people were left homeless by flooding triggered by torrential rains from the storm.

=== Tropical Cyclone Imani ===
- Tropical cyclone (MFR)
- Category 1 tropical cyclone (SSHWS)
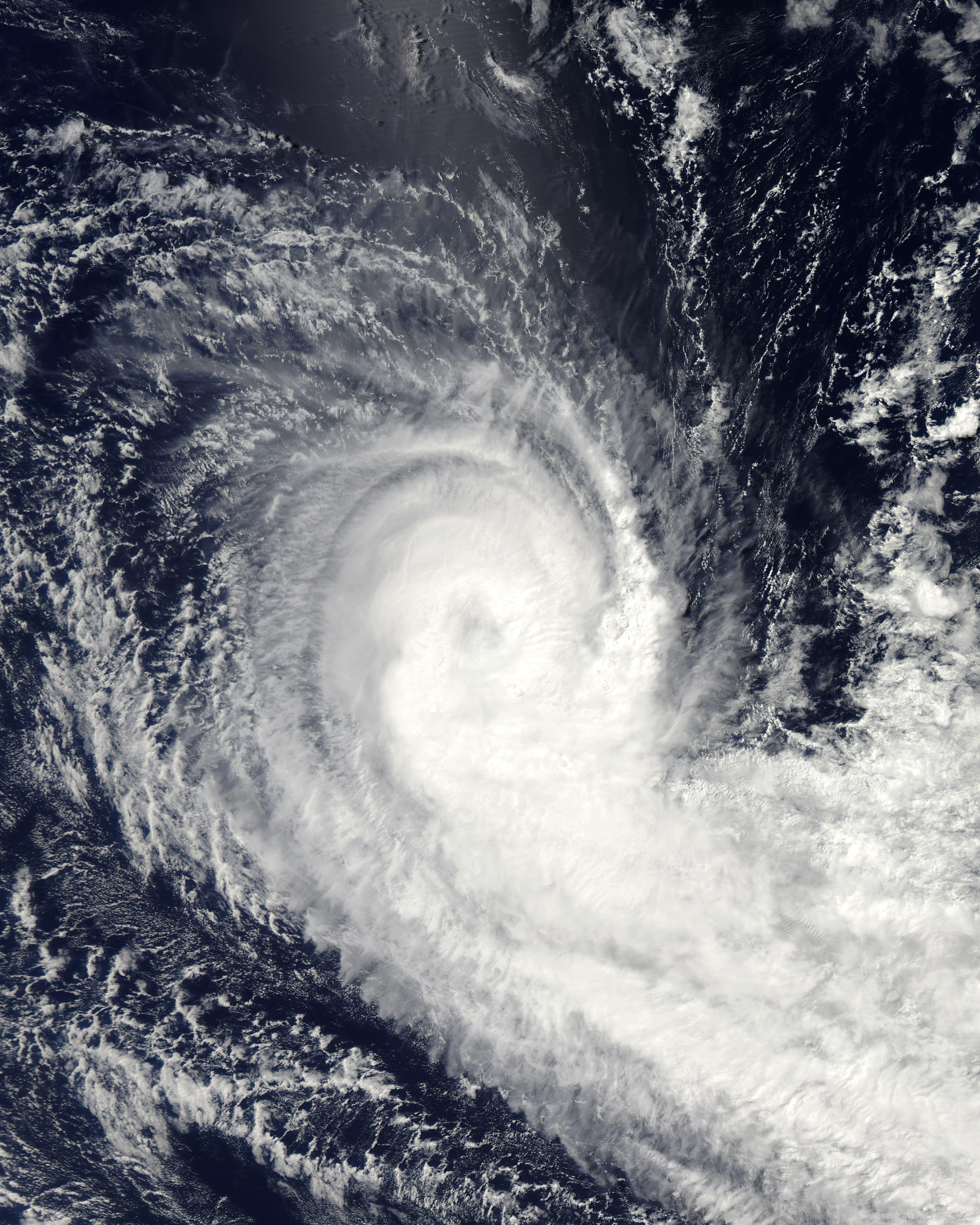
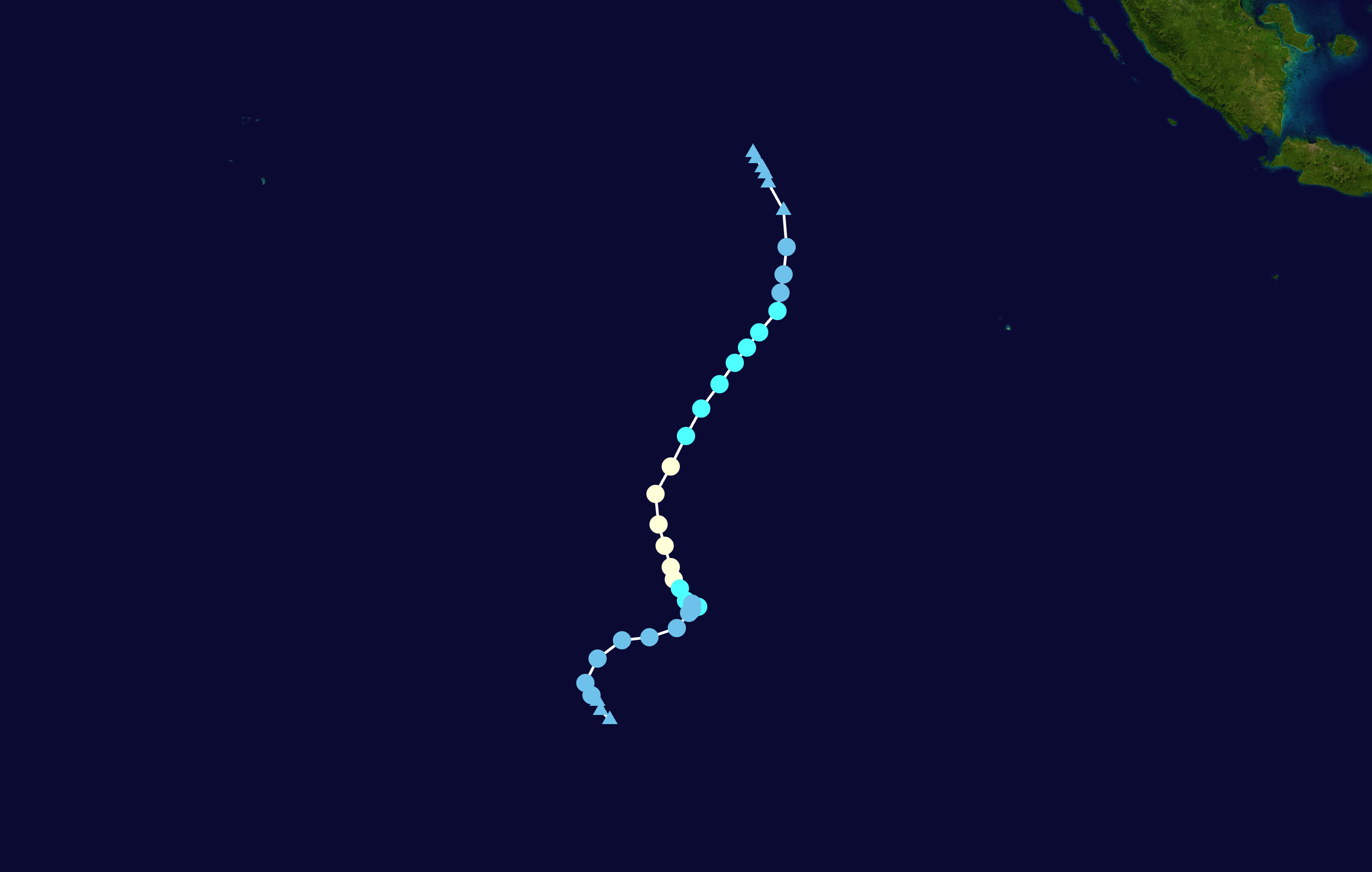
- Duration: March 20 – March 28
- Peak intensity: 130 km/h (80 mph) (10-min); 965 hPa (mbar)

Tropical Disturbance 14 formed on 22 March in the far east of the SW Indian Ocean basin, close to 90ºE. Although the precursor disturbance had been drifting eastwards, TD 14 was predicted to remain in this basin and not move into the Australian. It became a tropical depression later the same day, and was upgraded to Moderate Tropical Storm Imani on 23 March and a Severe Tropical Storm the next day. It continued to strengthen as it moved southwards, and reached tropical cyclone strength on 25 March. It started to dissipate on March 26, and La Réunion had stopped releasing advisories on Imani at 1200z, March 26.

=== Tropical Depression 15 (Robyn) ===
- Tropical depression (MFR)
- Tropical depression (SSHWS)
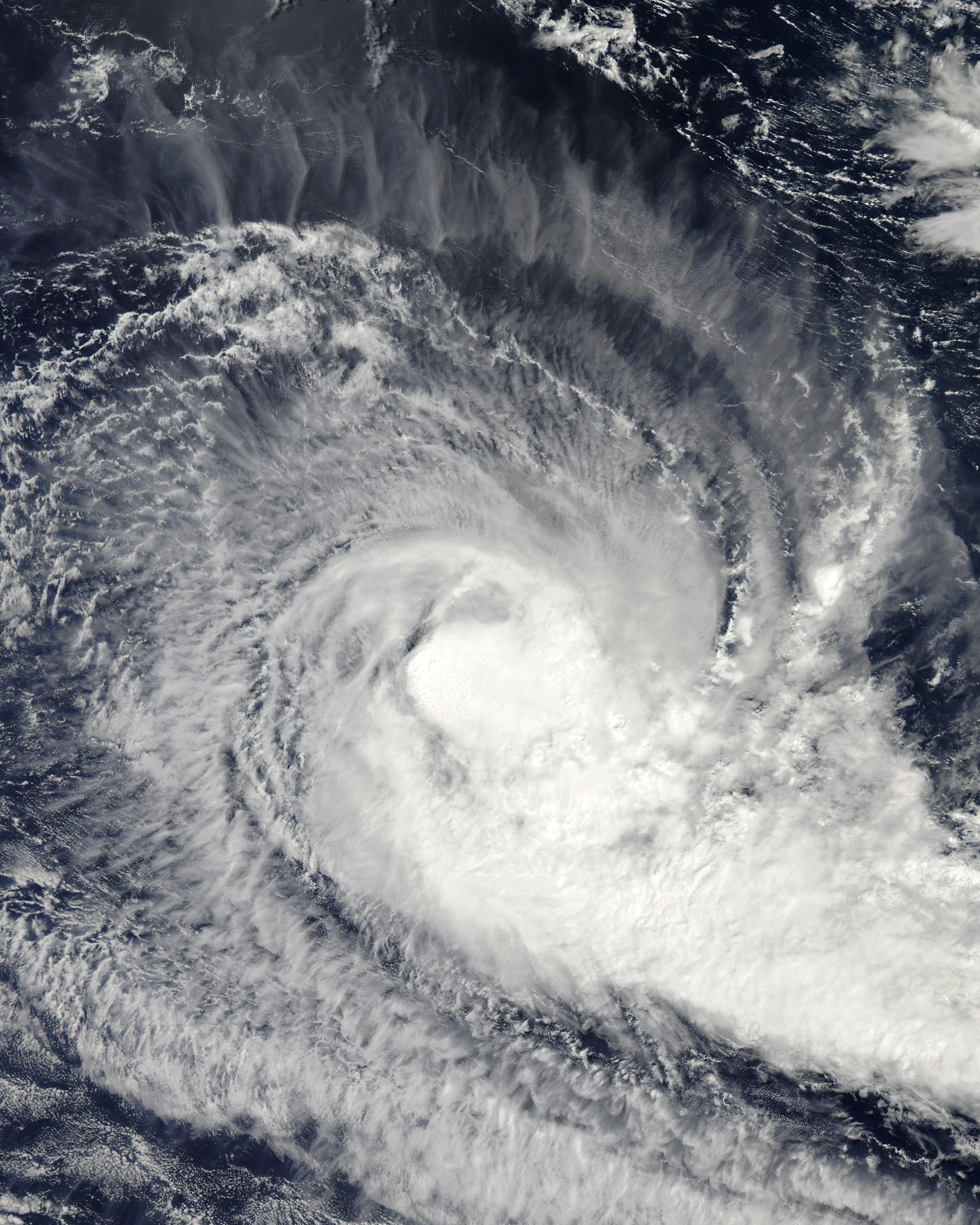
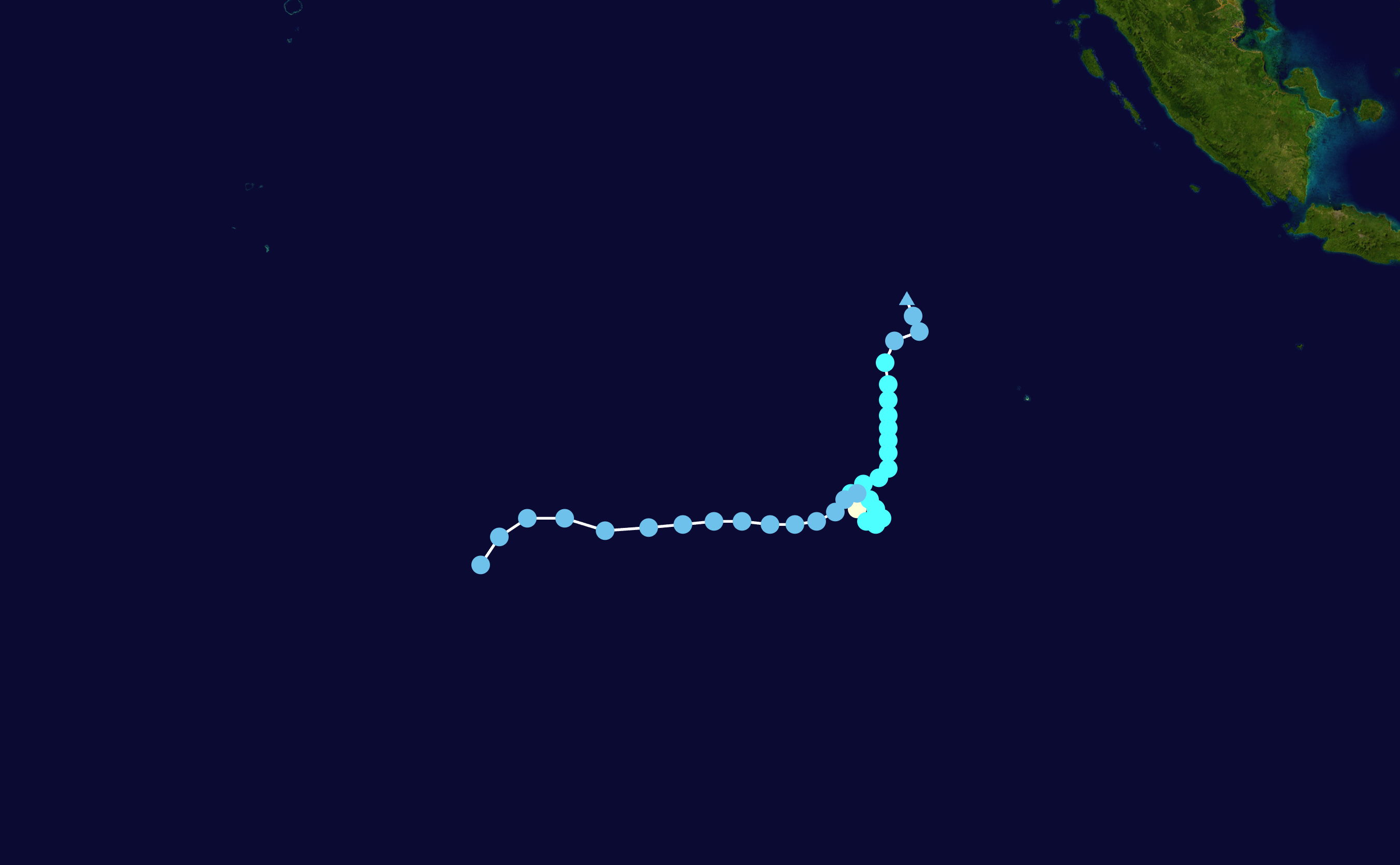
- Duration: April 7 – April 7
- Peak intensity: 55 km/h (35 mph) (10-min); 1002 hPa (mbar)

The remnants of Cyclone Robyn crossed into this basin on 7 April as a Filling Depression, and a single advisory was issued by RSMC La Réunion.

=== Subtropical Depression Joël ===
- Subtropical depression (MFR)
- Subtropical storm (SSHWS)
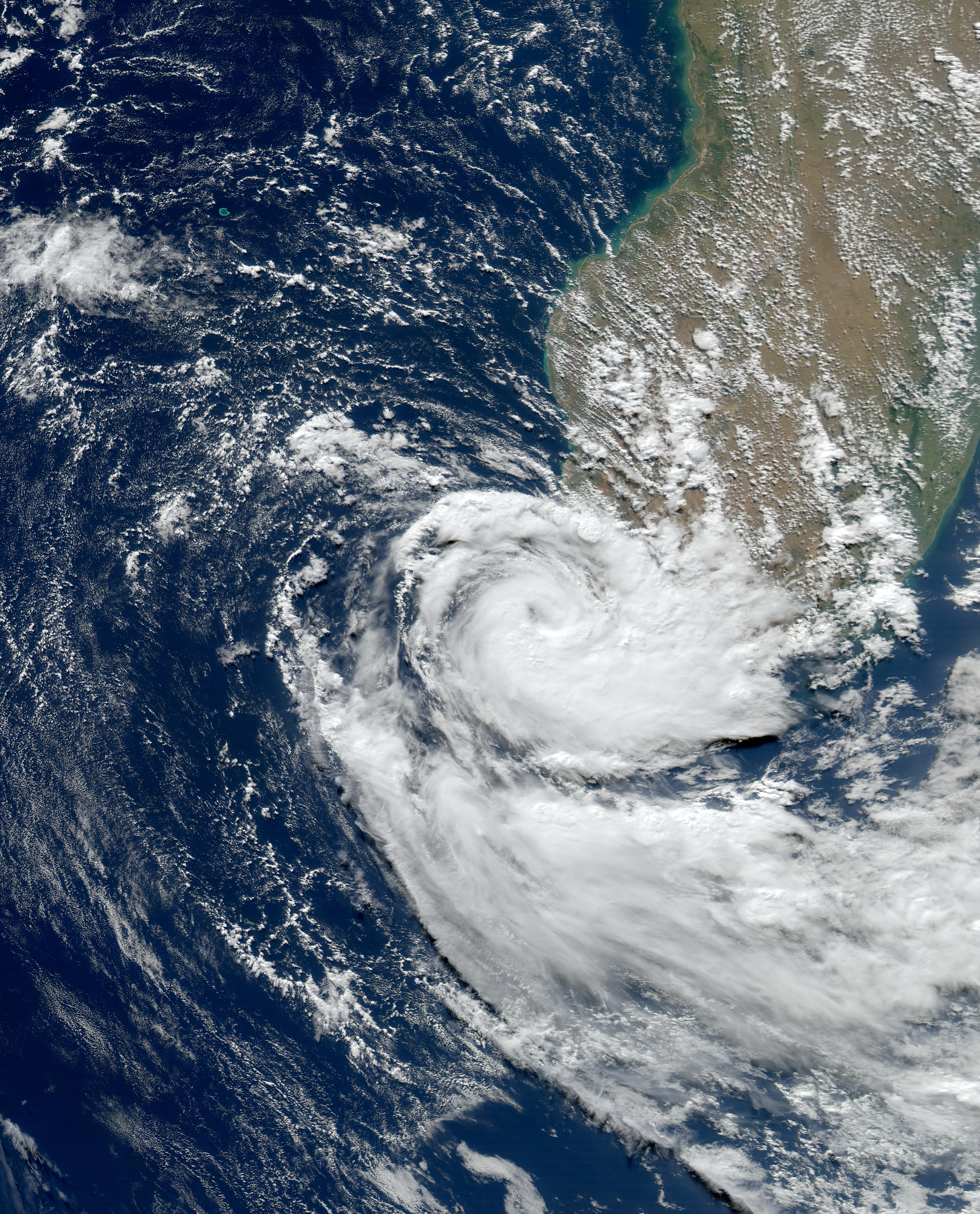
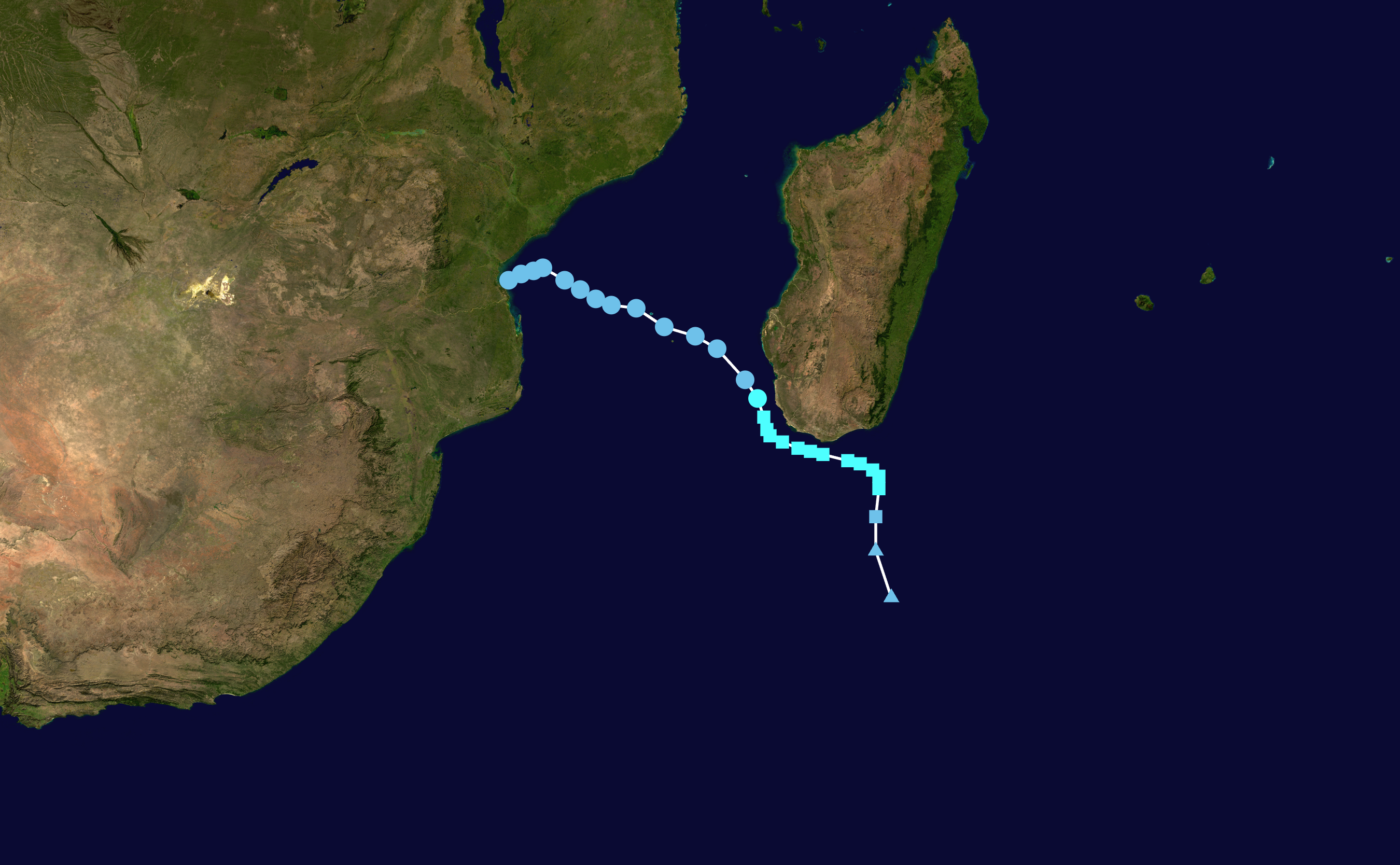
- Duration: May 26 – May 29
- Peak intensity: 110 km/h (70 mph) (10-min); 990 hPa (mbar)

An area of convection southwest of Madagascar was designated Subtropical Depression 16 by RSMC La Réunion on 26 May. The small system strengthened rapidly and was soon named Joël, although still classified as a Subtropical Depression. NASA also considered the storm to have been subtropical, attaining peak one-minute sustained winds of 85 km/h (55 mph).

== Storm names ==
Tropical disturbances are named upon reaching moderate tropical storm strength. If a tropical disturbance reaches this intensity west of 55°E, then the Sub-Regional Tropical Cyclone Advisory Centre in Madagascar assigns the appropriate name to the storm. If it reaches moderate tropical storm strength between 55°E and 90°E, then the Sub-Regional Tropical Cyclone Advisory Centre in Mauritius names the storm. A new list of names is drawn up and used each year, so no names are retired. The names for this season are as follows:

- Anja
- Bongani
- Cleo
- David
- Edzani
- Fami
- Gelane
- Hubert
- Imani
- Joël
- Kanja (unused)
- Lunda (unused)
- Mohono (unused)
- Nigel (unused)
- Olympe (unused)
- Pamela (unused)
- Quentin (unused)
- Rahim (unused)
- Savana (unused)
- Themba (unused)
- Uyapo (unused)
- Viviane (unused)
- Walter (unused)
- Xangy (unused)
- Yemurai (unused)
- Zanele (unused)

== Season effects ==
This table lists all the storms that developed in the Southern Hemisphere during the 2009–2010 South-West Indian Ocean cyclone season. It includes their intensity, duration, name, landfalls, deaths, and damages. All data is taken from Météo-France. The damage figures are all from 2009 USD.

Name	Dates	Peak intensity			Areas affected	Damage (USD)	Deaths	Ref(s).
Name	Dates	Category	Wind speed	Pressure	Areas affected	Damage (USD)	Deaths	Ref(s).
01	August 18	Tropical disturbance	35 km/h (20 mph)	1,004 hPa (29.65 inHg)	None	None	None	
02	September 18–20	Zone of disturbed weather	35 km/h (20 mph)	1,008 hPa (29.77 inHg)	None	None	None	
03	September 18–20	Tropical disturbance	45 km/h (30 mph)	1,002 hPa (29.59 inHg)	None	None	None	
Anja	November 14–18	Intense tropical cyclone	165 km/h (105 mph)	950 hPa (28.05 inHg)	None	None	None	
Bongani	November 22 – 25	Moderate tropical storm	75 km/h (45 mph)	997 hPa (29.44 inHg)	Madagascar, Mayotte, Comoros	Unknown	Unknown	
Cleo	December 6–14	Intense tropical cyclone	195 km/h (120 mph)	930 hPa (27.46 inHg)	None	None	None	
David	December 12 – 25	Moderate tropical Storm	85 km/h (50 mph)	987 hPa (29.15 inHg)	Reunion, Mauritius, Madagascar	Unknown	Unknown	
Edzani	January 4–14	Very intense tropical cyclone	220 km/h (135 mph)	910 hPa (26.87 inHg)	None	None	None	
09	January 15	Tropical disturbance	45 km/h (30 mph)	1,005 hPa (29.68 inHg)	Reunion, Mauritius, Madagascar	None	None	
10/11S	January 26–30	Subtropical depression	65 km/h (40 mph)	1,005 hPa (29.68 inHg)	Reunion, Mauritius, Madagascar	None	None	
Fami	February 1 – 3	Moderate tropical storm	85 km/h (50 mph)	994 hPa (29.35 inHg)	Madagascar	Unknown	Unknown	
Gelane	February 15–22	Intense tropical cyclone	205 km/h (125 mph)	930 hPa (27.46 inHg)	Reunion, Mauritius, Rodrigues, Madagascar	None	None	
Hubert	March 7–15	Severe tropical storm	100 km/h (60 mph)	985 hPa (29.09 inHg)	Madagascar	Unknown	85	
Imani	March 20–27	Tropical cyclone	130 km/h (80 mph)	965 hPa (28.50 inHg)	None	None	None	
Robyn	April 7	Tropical depression	55 km/h (35 mph)	998 hPa (29.47 inHg)	None	None	None	
Joël	May 22 – 29, 2010	Subtropical depression	110 km/h (70 mph)	990 hPa (29.23 inHg)	Mozambique, Madagascar	Minimal	Unknown	
Season aggregates
16 systems	August 18 – May 29		220 km/h (135 mph)	910 hPa (26.87 inHg)		Unknown	85	

== See also ==
- Tropical cyclones in 2009 and 2010
- South-West Indian Ocean tropical cyclone
- List of Southern Hemisphere cyclone seasons
- Atlantic hurricane seasons: 2009, 2010
- Pacific hurricane seasons: 2009, 2010
- Pacific typhoon seasons: 2009, 2010
- North Indian Ocean cyclone seasons: 2009, 2010
- 2009–10 Australian region cyclone season
- 2009–10 South Pacific cyclone season
