= Bongani Msomi =

South African politician

Bongani Msomi is a South African politician and the former secretary general of the UDM, a political party founded by South African politician Bantu Holomisa. He serves as the current Chairperson of the UDM.
