= Timeline of the 2010 Pacific typhoon season =

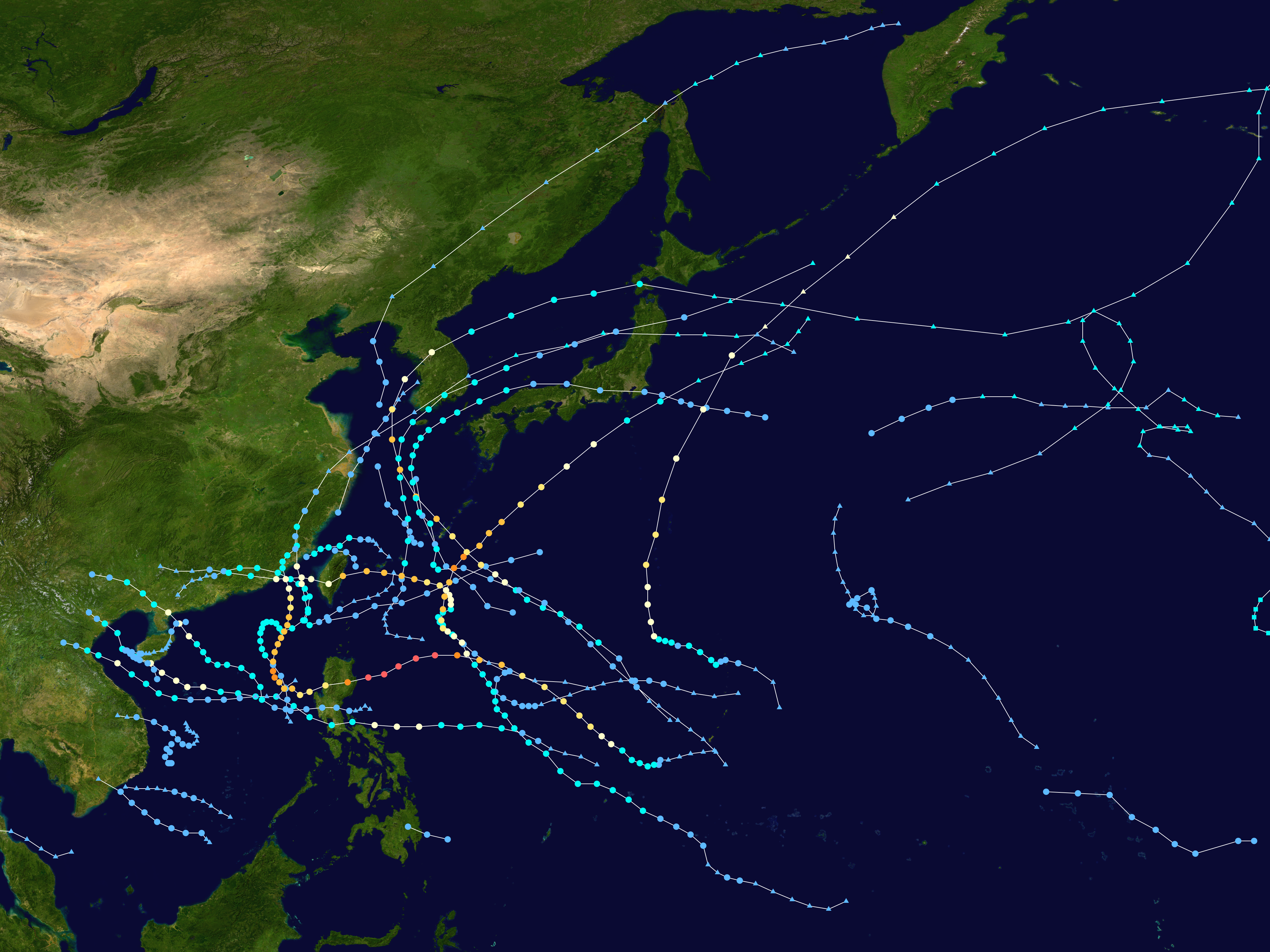
- Season summary map

Season boundaries
- First system formed: January 18, 2010
- Last system dissipated: December 20, 2010

Strongest system
- Name: Megi
- Maximum winds: 230 km/h (145 mph) (10-minute sustained)
- Lowest pressure: 885 hPa (mbar)

Longest lasting system
- Name: Megi
- Duration: 12 days
Storm articles
- Typhoon Conson (2010)
- Typhoon Chanthu (2010)
- Typhoon Kompasu (2010)
- Typhoon Fanapi
- Typhoon Megi (2010)
- Typhoon Chaba (2010)
- Tropical Storm Omeka

This timeline documents all of the events of the 2010 Pacific typhoon season. Most of the tropical cyclones forming between May and November. The scope of this article is limited to the Pacific Ocean, north of the equator between 100°E and the International Date Line. Tropical storms that form in the entire Western Pacific basin are assigned a name by the Japan Meteorological Agency. Tropical depressions that form in this basin are given a number with a "W" suffix by the United States' Joint Typhoon Warning Center. In addition, the Philippine Atmospheric, Geophysical and Astronomical Services Administration (PAGASA) assigns names to tropical cyclones (including tropical depressions) that enter or form in the Philippine area of responsibility. These names, however, are not in common use outside of the Philippines.

During the season, 32 systems were designated as Tropical Depressions by either, the Japan Meteorological Agency (JMA), the Philippine Atmospheric, Geophysical and Astronomical Services Administration (PAGASA), the Joint Typhoon Warning Center (JTWC), or other National Meteorological and Hydrological Services such as the China Meteorological Administration and the Hong Kong Observatory. As they run the Regional Specialized Meteorological Centre for the Western Pacific, the JMA assigns names to Tropical Depressions should they intensify into a tropical storm. PAGASA also assign local names to tropical depressions which form within their area of responsibility; however, these names are not in common use outside of PAGASA's area of responsibility. In this season, 11 systems entered or formed in the Philippine area of responsibility, which only two of them directly made landfall over the Philippines.

Overall, there were only 14 named storms which developed during the season, which makes it the lowest on record. This is due to the La Niña, which was last occurred during 1998. The first half of the season was extremely quiet with only four tropical depressions forming, which one of the only made it to tropical storm strength.

For convenience of following systems monitored my multiple agencies, all systems are listed with an unofficial "Storm ID" which is derived from the total number of tropical cyclones monitored during the year.

== Timeline of events ==
=== January ===
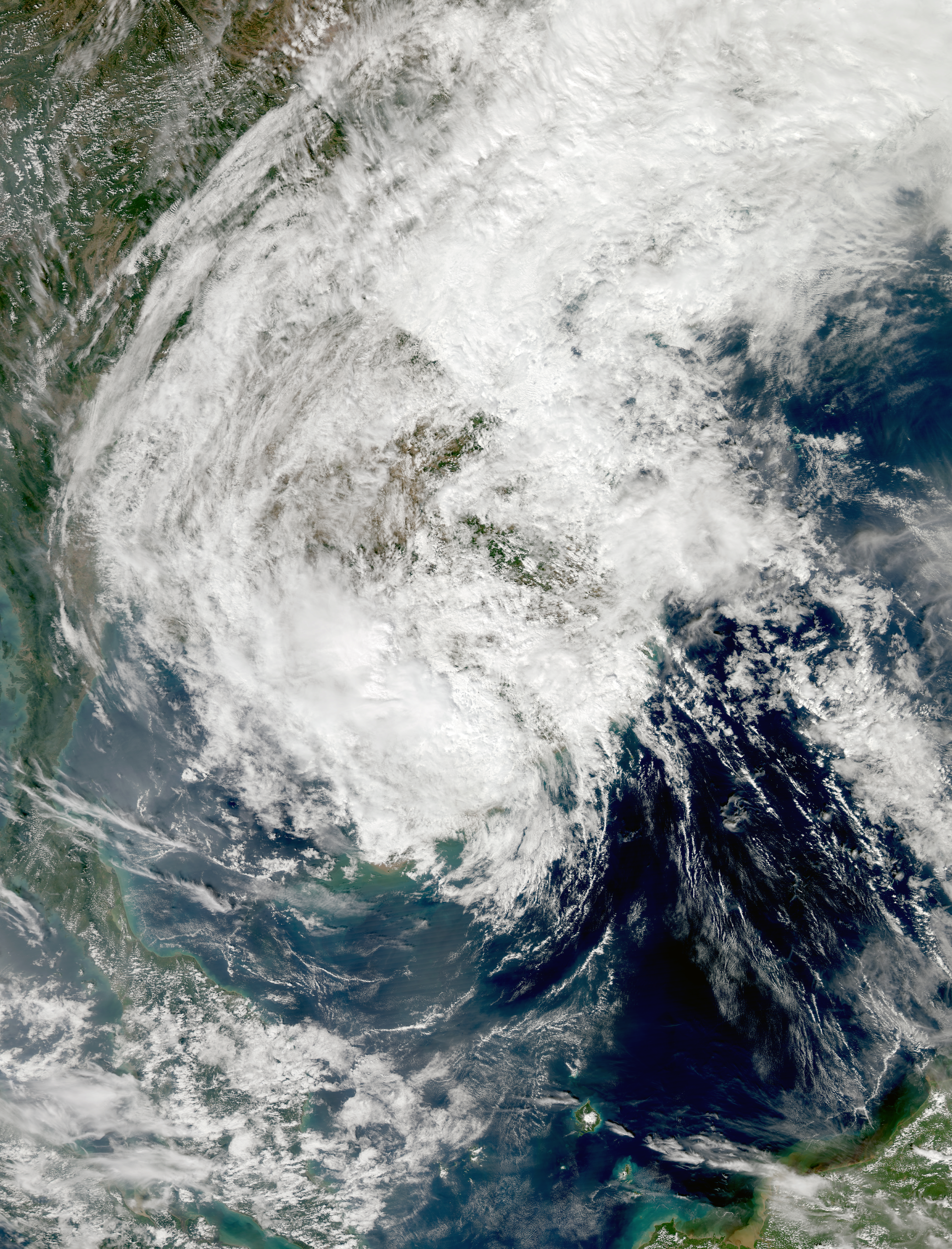
Tropical Depression 01W several hours after landfall in Vietnam

January 18

- 06:00 UTC at 10.0°N 113.0°E – A tropical depression develops 765 km (465 mi) southeast of Ho Chi Minh City, Vietnam.
- 12:00 UTC at 7.5°N 112.7°E – Tropical Depression 01W develops 760 km (460 mi) southeast of Ho Chi Minh City, Vietnam.

January 19

- 00:00 UTC at 7.8°N 110.8°E – Tropical Depression 01W reaches its peak strength with winds of 55 km/h (35 km/h).
- 06:00 UTC at 8.0°N 110.0°E – The tropical depression attains its lowest pressure of 1006 hPa (mbar; 29.71 inHg).

January 20

- 00:00–06:00 UTC – The tropical depression makes landfall over the Bình Đại District of Vietnam.

Tropical Depression 01W makes landfall near Vũng Tàu, Vietnam, with winds of 45 km/h (30 mph).

- 06:00 UTC at 10.9°N 106.2°E – Tropical Depression 01W degenerates into a tropical disturbance near the Cambodia–Vietnam border.
- 18:00 UTC at| 11.0°N 106.0°E – The final bulletin on the tropical depression is issued.

=== February ===
- There were no tropical depressions reported in the Northwestern Pacific during February.

=== March ===
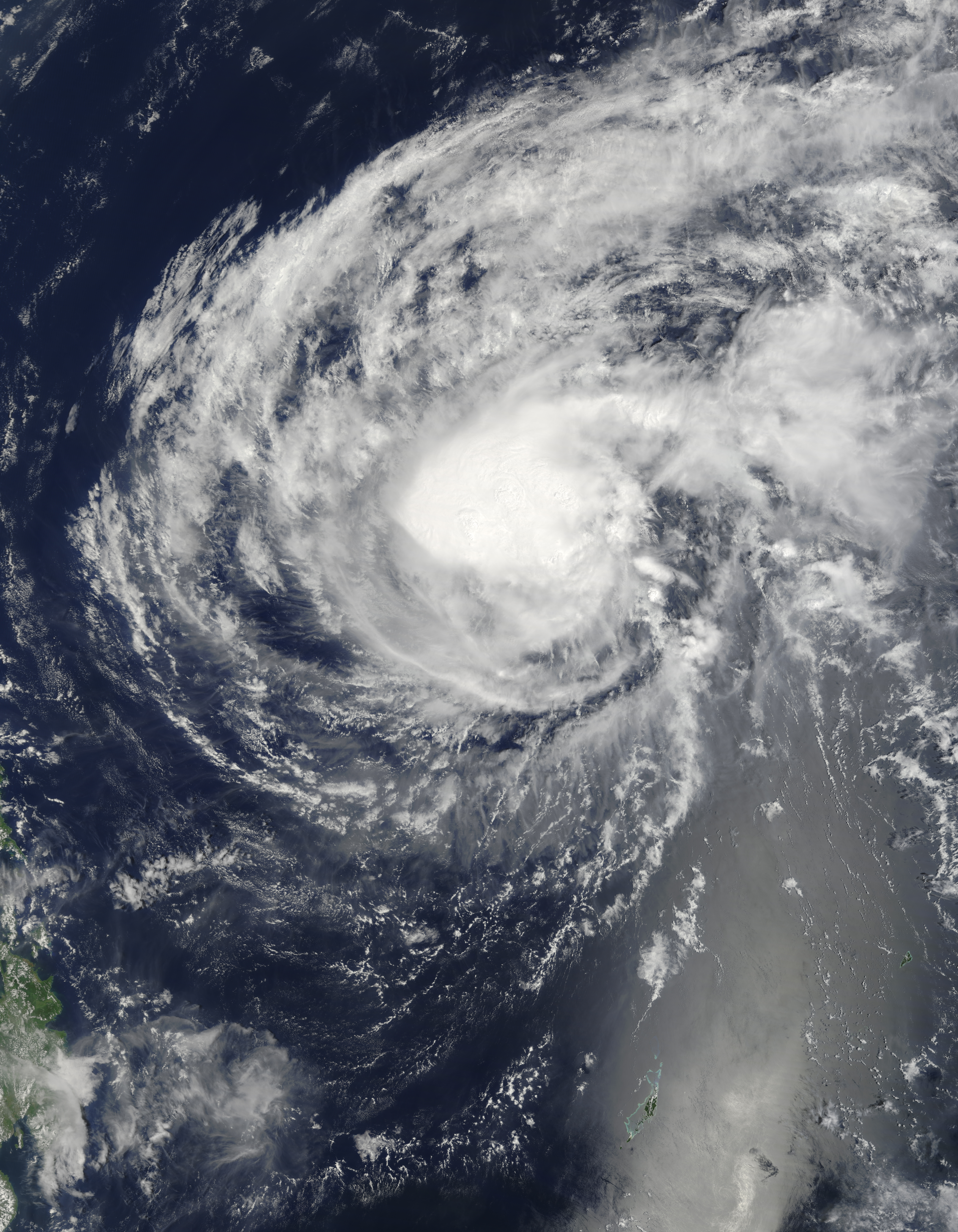
Tropical Storm Omais on March 25

March 21

- 18:00 UTC at 6.7°N 144.3°E – Tropical Depression 02W develops about 725 km (450 mi) south of Guam.

March 22

- 06:00 UTC at 8.4°N 141.7°E – A tropical depression develops 765 km (465 mi) southeast of Ho Chi Minh City, Vietnam.
- 18:00 UTC at 8.9°N 140.5°E – Tropical Depression 02W strengthens into a tropical storm roughly 665 km (415 mi) southwest of Guam.

March 24

- 00:00 UTC at 12.6°N 135.2°E – Advisories on Tropical Depression Agaton are initiated.
- 12:00 UTC at 13.6°N 133.4°E – The tropical depression strengthens into a tropical storm and is assigned the name Omais roughly 895 km (555 mi) east-northeast of Borongan, Philippines. It simultaneously reaches its peak intensity with winds of 65 km/h (40 mph) and a pressure of 998 hPa (mbar; 29.47 inHg).
- 18:00 UTC at 14.1°N 132.4°E – Tropical Storm 02W reaches its peak strength with winds of 95 km/h (60 mph) approximately 805 km (500 mi) east-northeast of Borongan, Philippines.

March 25

- 18:00 UTC at 16.4°N 131.2°E – Tropical Storm 02W weakens to a tropical depression about 815 km (505 mi) northeast of Borongan, Philippines.

March 26

- 00:00 UTC at 17.4°N 131.9°E – Tropical Storm Omais weakens to a tropical depression about 945 km (585 mi) northeast of Borongan, Philippines.
- 06:00 UTC at 18.2°N 131.9°E – Tropical Depression 02W transitions into an extratropical cyclone roughly 1,010 km (630 mi) northeast of Borongan, Philippines.

March 27

- 00:00 UTC at 17.7°N 132.1°E – Tropical Depression Omais dissipates roughly 985 km (610 mi) northeast of Borongan, Philippines.

=== April ===
April 26

- 0000 UTC, (0800 UTC+8) - The JMA reports that a tropical depression has formed about 1120 km (700 mi) to the southeast of Manila in the Philippines.
- 1800 UTC, (0200 UTC+8, April 27) - The JMA issues the last advisory on the tropical depression as the depression weakens into an area of low pressure.

=== May ===
- There were no tropical depressions reported in the Northwestern Pacific during May.

=== June ===
June 3

- 1800 UTC, (0200 UTC+8 June 4) — The JMA reports that a Tropical Depression has formed about 600 km, (370 mi) to the northwest of Manila in the Philippines.

June 5

- 1800 UTC, (0200 UTC+8 June 6) — The JMA releases the final advisory on the Tropical Depression as it has dissipated.

=== July ===
July 11

- 1200 UTC, (2000 UTC+8) - The JTWC reports that Tropical Depression 03W has formed about 1250 km (775 mi) to the southeast of Manila, Philippines.
- 1200 UTC, (1400 UTC+8) - The JMA starts monitoring Tropical Depression 03W as a tropical depression.
- 1800 UTC, (0200 UTC+8 July 12) - The JTWC reports that Tropical Depression 03W has intensified into a tropical storm.
- 2100 UTC, (0500 UTC+8) - PAGASA reports that Tropical Depression 03W has entered its area of responsibility and names it as Basyang.

July 12

- 0000 UTC, (0800 UTC+8) - The JMA reports that Tropical Depression Basyang (03W) has intensified into a tropical storm and names it as Conson.
- 1200 UTC, (2000 UTC+8) - The JMA reports that Tropical Storm Conson, (Basyang, 03W) has intensified into a severe tropical storm.
- 1800 UTC, (0200 UTC+8 July 13) - The JMA reports that Severe Tropical Storm Conson, (Basyang, 03W) has intensified into a typhoon.
- 1800 UTC, (0200 UTC+8 July 13) - The JMA reports that Typhoon Conson, (Basyang, 03W) has reached its ten-minute peak sustained windspeeds of 130 km/h, (80 mph).
- 1800 UTC, (0200 UTC+8, July 13) - The JTWC reports that Tropical Storm Conson, (Basyang, 03W) has intensified into a typhoon.

July 13

- 0000 UTC, (0800 UTC+8) - The JTWC reports that Typhoon Conson, (Basyang, 03W) has reached its one-minute peak sustained windspeeds of 130 km/h, (80 mph).
- 1200 UTC, (2000 UTC+8) - The JTWC reports that Typhoon Conson, (Basyang, 03W) has weakened into a tropical storm.
- 1800 UTC, (0200 UTC+8, July 14) - Typhoon Conson, (Basyang, 03W) makes landfall on Quezon Provence in the Philippines.
- 1800 UTC, (0200 UTC+8, July 14) - The JMA reports that Typhoon Conson, (Basyang, 03W) has weakened into a severe tropical storm.

July 14

- 1200 UTC, (2000 UTC+8) - The JMA reports that Severe Tropical Storm Conson, (Basyang, 03W) has weakened into a tropical storm.

July 15

- 0000 UTC, (0800 UTC+8) - The JMA reports that Tropical Storm Conson, (Basyang, 03W) has intensified into a severe tropical storm.
- 1200 UTC, (2000 UTC+8) - The JMA reports that Severe Tropical Storm Conson, (Basyang, 03W) has intensified into a typhoon.
- 1200 UTC, (2000 UTC+8) - The JMA reports that Typhoon Conson, (Basyang, 03W) has regained its ten-minute peak sustained windspeeds of 130 km/h, (80 mph).
- 1200 UTC, (2000 UTC+8) - The JTWC reports that Tropical Storm Conson, (Basyang, 03W) has intensified into a typhoon.

July 16

- 0000 UTC, (0800 UTC+8) - The JTWC reports that Typhoon Conson, (Basyang, 03W) has reached its one-minute peak sustained windspeeds of 140 km/h, (85 mph).
- 1800 UTC, (0200 UTC+8 July 17) - The JTWC reports that Typhoon Conson, (Basyang, 03W) has weakened into a tropical storm.

July 17

- 0000 UTC, (0800 UTC+8) - The JMA reports that Typhoon Conson has weakened into a severe tropical storm.
- 0600 UTC, (1400 UTC+8) - The JMA reports that a Tropical Depression has formed about 260 km, (160 mi) to the northeast of Manila in the Philippines.
- 1200 UTC, (2000 UTC+8) - The JMA reports that Severe Tropical Storm Conson has weakened into a tropical storm.
- 1500 UTC, (2300 UTC+8 July 18) - Tropical Storm Conson makes landfall in northern Vietnam.
- 1800 UTC, (0200 UTC+8 July 18) - The JTWC reports that Tropical Storm Conson (Basyang, 03W) has weakened into a tropical depression.

July 18

- 0000 UTC, (0800 UTC+8) - The JMA reports that Tropical Storm Conson, (Basyang, 03W) has weakened into a tropical depression.
- 0000 UTC, (0800 UTC+8) - The JMA issues the final advisory on Tropical Depression Conson, (Basyang, 03W) as it dissipates over Vietnam.
- 0600 UTC, (1400 UTC+8) - The JMA Tropical Depression previously located to the northeast of Manila makes landfall over the Philippines.
- 0900 UTC, (1700 UTC+8) - The JTWC designates the Tropical Depression as Tropical Depression 04W.
- 1200 UTC, (2000 UTC+8) - The JMA reports that a Tropical Depression has formed about 560 km, (350 mi) to the northeast of Taipei City in Taiwan.
- 2100 UTC, (0500 UTC+8 July 19) - PAGASA names Tropical Depression 04W as Caloy.

July 19

- 1200 UTC, (2000 UTC+8) - The JMA reports that Tropical Depression Caloy (04W), has intensified into a tropical storm and names it as Chanthu.
- 1800 UTC, (0200 UTC+8 July 21) - The JTWC reports that Tropical Depression Chanthu (Caloy, 04W), has intensified into a tropical storm.

July 20

- 1200 UTC, (2000 UTC+8) - The JMA issues their final advisory on the tropical depression previously located to the northeast of Taipei City in Taiwan as it dissipates.
- 1800 UTC, (0200 UTC+8 July 21) - The JMA reports that Tropical Storm Chanthu (Caloy, 04W) has intensified into a severe tropical storm.

July 21

- 1200 UTC, (2000 UTC+8) - The JMA reports that Severe Tropical Storm Chanthu (Caloy, 04W) has intensified into a typhoon.

July 22

- 0000 UTC, (0800 UTC+8) - The JMA reports that Typhoon Chanthu (Caloy, 04W) has regained its ten-minute peak sustained windspeeds of 130 km/h, (80 mph).
- 0000 UTC, (0800 UTC+8) - The JTWC reports that Tropical Storm Chanthu (Caloy, 04W) has intensified into a typhoon.
- 0000 UTC, (0800 UTC+8) - The JTWC reports that Typhoon Chanthu (Caloy, 04W) has reached its one-minute peak sustained windspeeds of 140 km/h, (85 mph).
- 0300 UTC, (1400 UTC+8) - Typhoon Chanthu (Caloy, 04W) makes landfall on Guangdong Province in southern China.
- 1200 UTC, (2000 UTC+8) - The JTWC reports that Typhoon Chanthu (Caloy, 04W) has weakened into a tropical storm.
- 1800 UTC, (0200 UTC+8, July 23) - The JMA reports that Typhoon Chanthu (Caloy, 04W) has weakened into a severe tropical storm.

July 23

- 0000 UTC, (0800 UTC+8) - The JMA reports that Severe Tropical Storm Chanthu (Caloy, 04W) has weakened into a tropical storm.
- 0000 UTC, (0800 UTC+8) - The JTWC issues its final advisory on Tropical Storm Chanthu (Caloy, 04W).
- 0600 UTC, (1400 UTC+8) - The JMA reports that Tropical Storm Chanthu has weakened into a tropical depression.
- 1800 UTC, (0200 UTC+8, July 24) - The JMA reports that Tropical Depression Chanthu has dissipated.

July 24

- 0000 UTC, (0800 UTC+8) - The JMA reports that a tropical depression has formed about 40 km, (25 mi), to the east of Taipei, Taiwan.
- 1200 UTC, (2000 UTC+8) - The JMA reports that the tropical depression has made landfall in Yilan County, Taiwan.
- 1800 UTC, (0200 UTC+8) - The JMA issues its final advisory on the tropical depression as it dissipates off the coast of Fujian Province, China.

July 26

- 1800 UTC, (0200 UTC+8 July 23) - The JMA reports that a tropical depression has formed about 65 km, (40 mi).

July 28

- 0000 UTC, (0800 UTC+8) - The JMA issues their final advisory on the tropical depression as it dissipates within the Yellow Sea.

=== August ===
August 3

- 0900 UTC, (1700 UTC+8) - PAGASA reports that Tropical Depression Domeng has formed about 900 km, (560 mi), to the east of Manila in the Philippines.

August 4

- 0900 UTC, (1700 UTC+8) - PAGASA reports that Tropical Depression Domeng has intensified into a tropical storm.
- 0900 UTC, (1700 UTC+8) - PAGASA reports that Tropical Storm Domeng has reached its ten-minute peak sustained windspeeds of 65 km/h, (40 mph).
- 2100 UTC, (0500 UTC+8) - PAGASA reports that Tropical Storm Domeng has weakened into a tropical depression.

August 5

- 1500 UTC, (2300 UTC+8) - PAGASA issues its final advisory on Tropical Depression Domeng, as it weakens into a low-pressure area.

August 6

- 2100 UTC, (0500 UTC+8) – PAGASA reports that Tropical Depression Ester has formed about 635 km, (400 mi), to the northeast of Manila in the Philippines.

August 7

- 0000 UTC, (0800 UTC+8) – The JMA starts to monitor Tropical Depression Ester as a tropical depression.

August 8

- 0000 UTC, (0800 UTC+8) – The JTWC designates Tropical Depression Ester as Tropical Depression 05W.
- 1200 UTC, (2000 UTC+8) – The JMA reports that Tropical Depression Ester, (05W), has intensified into a tropical storm and names it as Dianmu.
- 1800 UTC, (2000 UTC+8) – The JTWC reports that Tropical Depression Dianmu, (Ester, 05W), has intensified into a tropical storm.

August 9

- 0300 UTC, (1100 UTC+8) – PAGASA issues its final advisory on Tropical Storm Dianmu, (Ester, 05W), as it leaves their area of responsibility.
- 0600 UTC, (1400 UTC+8) – The JMA reports that Tropical Storm Dianmu, (Ester, 05W), has intensified into a severe tropical storm.
- 0600 UTC, (2000 UTC+8) – The JMA reports that Severe Tropical Storm Dianmu, (Ester, 05W), has reached its ten-minute peak sustained windspeeds of 95 km/h, (60 mph).

August 10

- 1200 UTC, (2000 UTC+8) – The JTWC reports that Tropical Storm Dianmu, (Ester, 05W), has reached its one-minute peak sustained windspeeds of 100 km/h, (65 mph).
- 2100 UTC, (0500 UTC+8) – Tropical Storm Dianmu makes landfall on Jeollanam-do Province, in South Korea.

August 11

- 0000 UTC, (2000 UTC+8) – The JMA reports that Severe Tropical Storm Dianmu, (Ester, 05W), has weakened into a tropical storm.
- 1800 UTC, (2000 UTC+8) – The JTWC reports that Tropical Storm Dianmu, (Ester, 05W), has weakened into a tropical depression.

August 12

- 0000 UTC, (0800 UTC+8) – The JTWC issues its final advisory on Tropical Depression Dianmu, (Ester, 05W), as it becomes an extratropical storm.
- 0900 UTC, (1700 UTC+8) – Tropical Storm Dianmu, (Ester, 05W), makes landfall on Akita Province in Japan.
- 1800 UTC, (2000 UTC+8) – The JMA reports that Tropical Storm Dianmu, (Ester, 05W), has weakened into an extratropical low.

August 13

- 0600 UTC, (1400 UTC+8) – The JMA issues the final advisory on extratropical low Dianmu, as it dissipates.

August 22

- 0000 UTC, (0800 UTC+8) – The JMA reports that a tropical depression has formed about 665 km, (415 mi), to the northeast of Manila on Luzon in the Philippines.
- 0600 UTC, (1400 UTC+8) – The JTWC designates the tropical depression as Tropical Depression 06W.

August 23

- 0000 UTC, (0800 UTC+8) – The JMA reports that Tropical Depression 06W, has intensified into a tropical storm and names it as Mindulle.
- 0000 UTC, (0800 UTC+8) – The JTWC reports that Tropical Depression Mindulle, (06W), has intensified into a tropical storm.

August 24

- 0000 UTC, (0800 UTC+8) – The JTWC reports that Tropical Storm Mindulle, (06W), has reached its one-minute peak sustained windspeeds of 110 km/h, (70 mph).
- 0000 UTC, (0800 UTC+8) – The JMA reports that Tropical Storm Mindulle, (06W), has reached its ten-minute peak sustained windspeeds of 80 km/h, (50 mph).
- 0900 UTC, (1700 UTC+8) – Tropical Storm Mindulle, (06W), makes landfall on Nghệ An Province in northern Vietnam.
- 1800 UTC, (0200 UTC+8, August 25) – The JTWC reports that Tropical Storm Mindulle, (06W), has weakened into a tropical depression.
- 1800 UTC, (0200 UTC+8, August 25) – The JTWC issues its final advisory on Tropical Depression Mindulle, (06W).

August 25

- 0000 UTC, (0800 UTC+8) – The JMA reports that Tropical Storm Mindulle, (06W), has weakened into a tropical depression.
- 0600 UTC, (1400 UTC+8) – The JMA reports that Tropical Storm Mindulle, (06W), has dissipated over land and issues its final advisory.

August 26

- 0600 UTC, (1400 UTC+8) – The JMA reports that a tropical depression has formed about 1425 km, (885 mi), to the northwest of Manila in the Philippines.

August 27

- 0600 UTC, (1400 UTC+8) – The JTWC reports that a Tropical Depression 07W has formed about 450 km, (280 mi), to the east of the Philippines.
- 0900 UTC, (1700 UTC+8) – PAGASA names Tropical Depression 07W as Florita.
- 1800 UTC, (0200 UTC+8, August 28) – The JMA starts to monitor Tropical Depression 07W, (Florita).

August 28

- 1200 UTC, (0200 UTC+8, August 29) – The JMA reports that a tropical depression has formed about 1985 km (1235 mi) to the east of Manila in the Philippines.
- 1200 UTC, (2000 UTC+8) – The JTWC reports that Tropical Depression Florita, (07W) has intensified into a tropical storm.
- 1800 UTC, (0200 UTC+8, August 29) – The JMA reports that Tropical Depression Florita, (07W) has intensified into a tropical storm.
- 1800 UTC, (0200 UTC+8, August 29) – The JMA issues their final advisory on the tropical depression previously located to the northwest of Manila as it dissipates to the south of Okinawa.
- 1800 UTC, (0200 UTC+8, August 29) – The JTWC designates the tropical depression to the east of Manila in the Philippines as Tropical Storm 08W.

August 29

- 0600 UTC, (1400 UTC+8) - The JTWC reports that Tropical Depression 09W has formed about 280 km, (175 mi) to the east of Taipei City, Taiwan.
- 0600 UTC, (1400 UTC+8 August 29) - The JMA starts to monitor Tropical Depression 09W as a tropical depression.
- 0900 UTC, (1700 UTC+8) – PAGASA reports that Tropical Depression 08W has moved into their area of responsibility and designates it as Tropical Storm Glenda.
- 1200 UTC, (2000 UTC+8) – The JMA names Tropical Depression Glenda as Kompasu.
- 1200 UTC, (2000 UTC+8) - The JMA names Tropical Depression 09W as Namtheun.
- 1200 UTC, (2000 UTC+8) - The JTWC reports that Tropical Depression Namtheun, (09W), has intensified into a tropical storm.
- 1200 UTC, (2000 UTC+8) – The JMA reports that Tropical Depression Kompasu, (08W, Glenda), has intensified into a tropical storm.
- 1800 UTC, (0200 UTC+8, August 30) – The JMA names Tropical Depression 07W, (Florita) as Lionrock.
- 1800 UTC, (0200 UTC+8, August 30) - The JMA reports that a tropical depression has formed about 3000 km, (1864 mi) to the southwest of Honolulu, Hawaii.
- 1800 UTC, (0200 UTC+8 August 30) - The JTWC reports that Tropical Storm Namtheun, (09W), has reached its one-minute peak sustained windspeeds of 85 km/h, (50 mph).

August 30

- 0600 UTC, (1400 UTC+8) – The JMA reports that Tropical Storm Kompasu, (Glenda, 08W), has intensified into a severe tropical storm.
- 0600 UTC, (1400 UTC+8) – The JTWC reports that Tropical Storm Kompasu, (Glenda, 08W), has intensified into a category one typhoon.
- 0600 UTC, (1400 UTC+8) – The JMA reports that Tropical Storm Lionrock, (07W, Florita) has intensified into a severe tropical storm.
- 0600 UTC, (1400 UTC+8) – The JMA reports that Severe Tropical Storm Lionrock, (07W, Florita) has reached its peak ten-minute sustained windspeeds of 90 km/h, (60 mph).
- 1200 UTC, (2000 UTC+8) – The JMA reports that Tropical Depression Namtheun, (09W) has intensified into a tropical storm.
- 1200 UTC, (2000 UTC+8) – The JMA reports that Tropical Depression Namtheun, (09W), has reached its peak ten-minute sustained windspeeds of 65 km/h, (40 mph).
- 1200 UTC, (2000 UTC+8) – The JTWC reports that Tropical Storm Lionrock, (07W, Florita) has reached its peak one-minute sustained windspeeds of 100 km/h, (65 mph).
- 1800 UTC, (0200 UTC+8, August 29) – The JMA reports that Severe Tropical Storm Kompasu, (Glenda, 08W), has intensified into a typhoon.
- 1800 UTC, (0200 UTC+8, August 29) – The JTWC reports that Typhoon Kompasu, (Glenda, 08W), has intensified into a category two typhoon.

August 31

- 0000 UTC, (0800 UTC+8) – The JMA reports that Typhoon Kompasu, (Glenda, 08W), has reached its ten-minute peak sustained windspeeds of 150 km/h, (90 mph).
- 0600 UTC, (1400 UTC+8 September 1) - The JMA reports that Tropical Storm Namtheun, (09W), has weakened into a tropical depression.
- 1200 UTC, (2000 UTC+8, September 1) - The JMA issues its final advisory on the tropical depression previously located to the southwest of Hawaii.
- 1200 UTC, (2000 UTC+8) – The JTWC reports that Typhoon Kompasu, (Glenda, 08W), has intensified into a category three typhoon.
- 1200 UTC, (2000 UTC+8) – The JTWC reports that Typhoon Kompasu, (Glenda, 08W), has reached its one-minute peak sustained windspeeds of 185 km/h, (115 mph).
- 1800 UTC, (0200 UTC+8 September 1) - The JMA reports that Tropical Depression Namtheun, (09W) has dissipated.

=== September ===
September 1

- 0000 UTC, (0800 UTC+8) – The JMA reports that Severe Tropical Storm Lionrock, (07W, Florita) has weakened into a tropical storm.
- 0000 UTC, (0800 UTC+8) – The JTWC issues their final advisory on Tropical Depression Namtheun, (09W).
- 0600 UTC, (1400 UTC+8) – The JTWC reports that Typhoon Kompasu, (Glenda, 08W), has weakened into a category two typhoon.
- 1200 UTC, (2000 UTC+8) – The JTWC reports that Typhoon Kompasu, (Glenda, 08W), has weakened into a category one typhoon.
- 1800 UTC, (0500 UTC+8) – The JMA reports that Typhoon Kompasu, (Glenda, 08W), has weakened into a severe tropical storm.
- 1800 UTC, (0200 UTC+8, September 2) – The JTWC reports that Tropical Depression 10W has formed about 2000 km (1250 mi), to the east of Manila in the Philippines.
- 1800 UTC, (0200 UTC+8, September 2) – The JMA starts to monitor Tropical Depression 10W as a tropical depression.
- 2100 UTC, (0500 UTC+8, September 2) – Typhoon Kompasu, (Glenda, 08W), makes landfall on Gyeonggi-do provence, in South Korea.

September 2

- 0000 UTC, (0800 UTC+8) – Tropical Storm Lionrock, (07W, Florita) makes landfall on Guangdong Province, in China.
- 0600 UTC, (1400 UTC+8) – The JMA reports that Tropical Storm Lionrock, (07W, Florita) has weakened into a tropical depression.
- 1800 UTC, (0200 UTC+8, August 29) – The JMA reports that Severe Tropical Storm Kompasu, (Glenda, 08W), has weakened into a tropical storm.
- 1200 UTC, (2000 UTC+8) – The JTWC reports that Tropical Storm Lionrock, (07W, Florita), has weakened into a tropical depression.
- 1200 UTC, (2000 UTC+8) – The JTWC reports that Typhoon Kompasu, (Glenda, 08W), has weakened into a tropical storm.
- 1800 UTC, (0200 UTC+8, August 29) – The JMA reports that Tropical Storm Kompasu, (Glenda, 08W), has weakened into a tropical depression.
- 1800 UTC, (0200 UTC+8, August 29) – The JTWC issues its final advisory on Tropical Storm Kompasu, (Glenda, 08W), as it becomes extratropical.
- 2100 UTC, (0500 UTC+8, September 3) – PAGASA reports that Tropical Depression 10W has moved into their area of responsibility and names it as Henry.

September 3

- 0000 UTC, (0800 UTC+8) – The JTWC issues their final advisory on Tropical Depression Lionrock, (07W, Florita).
- 0600 UTC, (1400 UTC+8) – The JMA reports that Tropical Depression 10W has intensified into a tropical storm and names it Malou.
- 0600 UTC, (1400 UTC+8) – The JTWC reports that Tropical Depression Malou, (Henry, 10W), has intensified into a tropical storm.
- 1200 UTC, (2000 UTC+8) – The JMA reports that Tropical Depression Kompasu, (Glenda, 08W), has weakened into an extratropical cyclone.

September 4

- 1200 UTC, (2000 UTC+8) – The JMA reports that Tropical Depression Lionrock, (07W, Florita) has dissipated over land.
- 0900 UTC, (1700 UTC+8) – PAGASA issues its final advisory on Tropical Storm Malou, (Henry, 10W), as it moves out of its area of responsibility.

September 6

- 0600 UTC, (1400 UTC+8) – The JMA reports that Tropical Storm Malou, (Henry, 10W), has intensified into a severe tropical storm.
- 0600 UTC, (1400 UTC+8) – The JMA reports that Severe Tropical Storm Malou, (Henry, 10W), has reached its ten-minute peak sustained windspeeds of 90 km/h, (60 mph).
- 0600 UTC, (1400 UTC+8) – The JMA reports that a tropical depression has formed about 985 km (615 mi) to the northeast of Manila, Philippines.
- 1200 UTC, (2000 UTC+8) – The JMA issues its final advisory on the extratropical cyclone Kompasu, as it moves out of the Western Pacific.
- 1200 UTC, (2000 UTC+8) – The JTWC reports that Tropical Storm Malou, (Henry, 10W), has reached its one-minute peak sustained windspeeds of 85 km/h, (50 mph).

September 7

- 0600 UTC, (1400 UTC+8) –
- 1800 UTC, (0200 UTC+8, September 2) – The JTWC reports that Tropical Storm Malou, (Henry, 10W), has weakened into a tropical depression.

September 8

- 0000 UTC, (0800 UTC+8) – The JTWC designates the tropical depression as Tropical Depression 11W.
- 0300 UTC, (1400 UTC+8) – Tropical Storm Malou, (Henry, 10W), makes landfall on Fukui Prefecture, in Japan.
- 0600 UTC, (1400 UTC+8) – The JTWC reports that Tropical Depression 11W has intensified into a tropical storm.
- 0600 UTC, (1400 UTC+8) – The JMA reports that Tropical Storm Malou, (Henry, 10W), has weakened into a tropical depression.

September 9

- 0000 UTC, (0800 UTC+8) – The JMA reports that Tropical Depression 11W has intensified into a tropical storm, and names it as Meranti.
- 1200 UTC, (2000 UTC+8) – The JTWC reports that Tropical Storm Meranti, (11W), has intensified into a typhoon.
- 1200 UTC, (2000 UTC+8) – The JTWC reports that Typhoon Meranti, (11W), has reached its one-minute peak sustained windspeeds of 120 km/h, (75 mph).
- 1800 UTC, (0200 UTC+8, September 10) – The JMA reports that Tropical Storm Meranti, (11W), has reached its ten-minute peak sustained windspeeds of 85 km/h, (55 mph).
- 2100 UTC, (0500 UTC+8, September 10) – Tropical Storm Meranti makes landfall on Fujian Provence in China.

September 10

- 0000 UTC, (0800 UTC+8) – The JTWC reports that Typhoon Meranti, (11W), has weakened into a tropical storm.
- 0000 UTC, (0800 UTC+8) – The JTWC issues their final advisory on Tropical Storm Meranti, (11W).
- 0600 UTC, (1400 UTC+8) – The JMA issues the final advisory on Tropical Depression Malou, (Henry, 10W), as it weakens into an extratropical low.
- 1200 UTC, (2000 UTC+8) – The JMA reports that Tropical Storm Meranti, (11W) has weakened into a tropical depression.

September 11

- 1200 UTC, (2000 UTC+8) – The JMA issues the final advisory on Tropical Depression Meranti.

September 14

- 1200 UTC, (2000 UTC+8) – The JMA reports that a tropical depression has formed about 1085 km to the northeast of Manila in the Philippines.
- 1800 UTC, (0200 UTC+8, September 21) – The JTWC designates the tropical depression as Tropical Depression 12W.

September 15

- 0000 UTC, (0800 UTC+8) – PAGASA designates Tropical Depression 12W as Tropical Depression Inday.
- 1200 UTC, (2000 UTC+8) – The JMA reports that Tropical Depression Inday, (12W), has intensified into a tropical storm and names it as Fanapi.
- 1200 UTC, (2000 UTC+8) – The JTWC reports that Tropical Depression Fanapi, (Inday, 12W), has intensified into a tropical storm.

September 16

- 0000 UTC, (0800 UTC+8) – The JMA reports that Tropical Storm Fanapi, (Inday, 12W), has intensified into a severe tropical storm.
- 1200 UTC, (2000 UTC+8) – The JMA reports that Severe Tropical Storm Fanapi, (Inday, 12W), has intensified into a typhoon.
- 1200 UTC, (2000 UTC+8) – The JTWC reports that Tropical Storm Fanapi, (Inday, 12W), has intensified into a category one typhoon.

September 17

- 1200 UTC, (2000 UTC+8) – The JTWC reports that Typhoon Fanapi, (Inday, 12W), has intensified into a category two typhoon.

September 18

- 0600 UTC, (1400 UTC+8) – The JTWC reports that Typhoon Fanapi, (Inday, 12W), has intensified into a category three typhoon.
- 1200 UTC, (2000 UTC+8) – The JTWC reports that Typhoon Fanapi, (Inday, 12W), has reached its one-minute peak sustained windspeeds of 195 km/h, (120 mph).
- 1800 UTC, (0200 UTC+8, September 21) – The JMA reports that Typhoon Fanapi, (Inday, 12W), has reached its ten-minute peak sustained windspeeds of 175 km/h, (110 mph).

September 19

- 0300 UTC, (1100 UTC+8) – Typhoon Fanapi, (Inday, 12W), makes landfall on Hualien County in Taiwan.
- 0300 UTC, (1100 UTC+8) – The JTWC reports that Typhoon Fanapi, (Inday, 12W), has weakened into a category two typhoon.
- 0600 UTC, (1400 UTC+8) – The JMA reports that Typhoon Fanapi, (Inday, 12W), has weakened into a severe tropical storm.
- 0600 UTC, (1400 UTC+8) – The JTWC reports that Typhoon Fanapi, (Inday, 12W), has weakened into a category one typhoon.

September 20

- 0000 UTC, (0800 UTC+8) – Severe Tropical Storm Fanapi, (Inday, 12W), makes landfall on Fujian Province, in China.
- 0600 UTC, (1400 UTC+8) – The JMA reports that Severe Tropical Storm Fanapi, (Inday, 12W), has weakened into a tropical storm.
- 0600 UTC, (1400 UTC+8) – The JTWC reports that Typhoon Fanapi, (Inday, 12W), has weakened into a tropical storm.
- 0600 UTC, (1400 UTC+8) – The JTWC reports that Tropical Depression 13W has formed about 55 km (35 mi)to the west of Agrihan in the Northern Mariana Islands.
- 0600 UTC, (1400 UTC+8) – The JMA starts to monitor Tropical Depression 13W as a tropical depression.
- 1800 UTC, (0200 UTC+8, September 21) – The JMA reports that Tropical Storm Fanapi, (Inday, 12W), has weakened into a tropical depression.
- 1800 UTC, (0200 UTC+8, September 21) – The JTWC reports that Tropical Storm Fanapi, (Inday, 12W), has weakened into a tropical depression.
- 1800 UTC, (0200 UTC+8, September 21) – The JTWC reports that Tropical Depression 13W has intensified into a tropical storm.

September 21

- 0600 UTC, (1400 UTC+8) – The JMA reports that Tropical Depression 13W has intensified into a tropical storm and names it as Malakas.
- 1200 UTC, (2000 UTC+8) – The JMA issues the final advisory on Tropical Depression Fanapi, (Inday, 12W).

September 22

- 1800 UTC, (0200 UTC+8, September 23) – The JMA reports that Tropical Storm Malakas, (13W), has intensified into a severe tropical storm.

September 23

- 0000 UTC, (0800 UTC+8) – The JTWC reports that Tropical Storm Malakas, (13W), has intensified into a category one typhoon.
- 1800 UTC, (0200 UTC+8, September 24) – The JMA reports that Severe Tropical Storm Malakas, (13W), has intensified into a typhoon.

September 24

- 0000 UTC, (0800 UTC+8) – The JTWC reports that Typhoon Malakas, (13W), has intensified into a category two typhoon.
- 0000 UTC, (0800 UTC+8) – The JTWC reports that Typhoon Malakas, (13W), has reached its one-minute peak sustained windspeeds of 165 km/h, (105 mph).
- 0600 UTC, (1400 UTC+8) – The JMA reports that Typhoon Malakas, (13W), has reached its ten-minute peak sustained windspeeds of 140 km/h, (85 mph).

September 25

- 0000 UTC, (0800 UTC+8) – The JTWC issues their final advisory on Typhoon Malakas, (13W), as it rapidly merges with a baroclinic zone.
- 1800 UTC, (0200 UTC+8, September 26) – The JMA reports that Typhoon Malakas, (13W), has weakened into an extratropical low.

September 29

- 1800 UTC, (0200 UTC+8, September 26) – The JMA reports that a tropical depression has formed, just outside the Western Pacific, about 2500 km, (1550 mi), to the southwest of Honolulu, Hawaii.

September 30

- 0000 UTC, (0800 UTC+8) – The JMA issues its final advisory on the tropical depression as it dissipates to the south of Hawaii.

=== October ===
October 5

- On October 5, the JTWC reported that a tropical depression had formed from a low pressure in the South China Sea.

October 11

- Tropical Depression 14W dissipated in the South China Sea.

October 12

- Late on October 12, JMA reported that a tropical depression formed west of Guam.

October 13

- It was upgraded to 15W by the JTWC.

October 31

- 0600 UTC, (1130 IST) - The Thai Meteorological Department reports that a tropical depression has formed about 490 km, (305 mi), to the southwest of Ho Chi Minh city.

=== November ===
November 1

- 0000 UTC, (1130 IST) - The Malaysian Meteorological Department starts to monitor the system as a tropical depression.
- 1200 UTC, (1730 IST) - The IMD starts to monitor the system as a Depression.
- 1630 UTC, (2130 IST) - The Depression makes landfall on Songkhla Province, Thailand.
- 1800 UTC, (2330 IST) - The TMD reports that the tropical depression has moved into the North Indian Ocean.

== See also ==
- Timeline of the 2010 Atlantic hurricane season
- Timeline of the 2010 Pacific hurricane season
- Timeline of the 2010 North Indian Ocean cyclone season
- Timelines of the South-West Indian Ocean cyclone seasons: 2009–10, 2010–11
- Timelines of the Australian region cyclone seasons: 2009–10, 2010–11
- Timelines of the South Pacific cyclone seasons: 2009–10, 2010–11
