= Timeline of the 2009–10 South-West Indian Ocean cyclone season =

Timeline of the 2009-2010 South-West Indian Ocean cyclone season
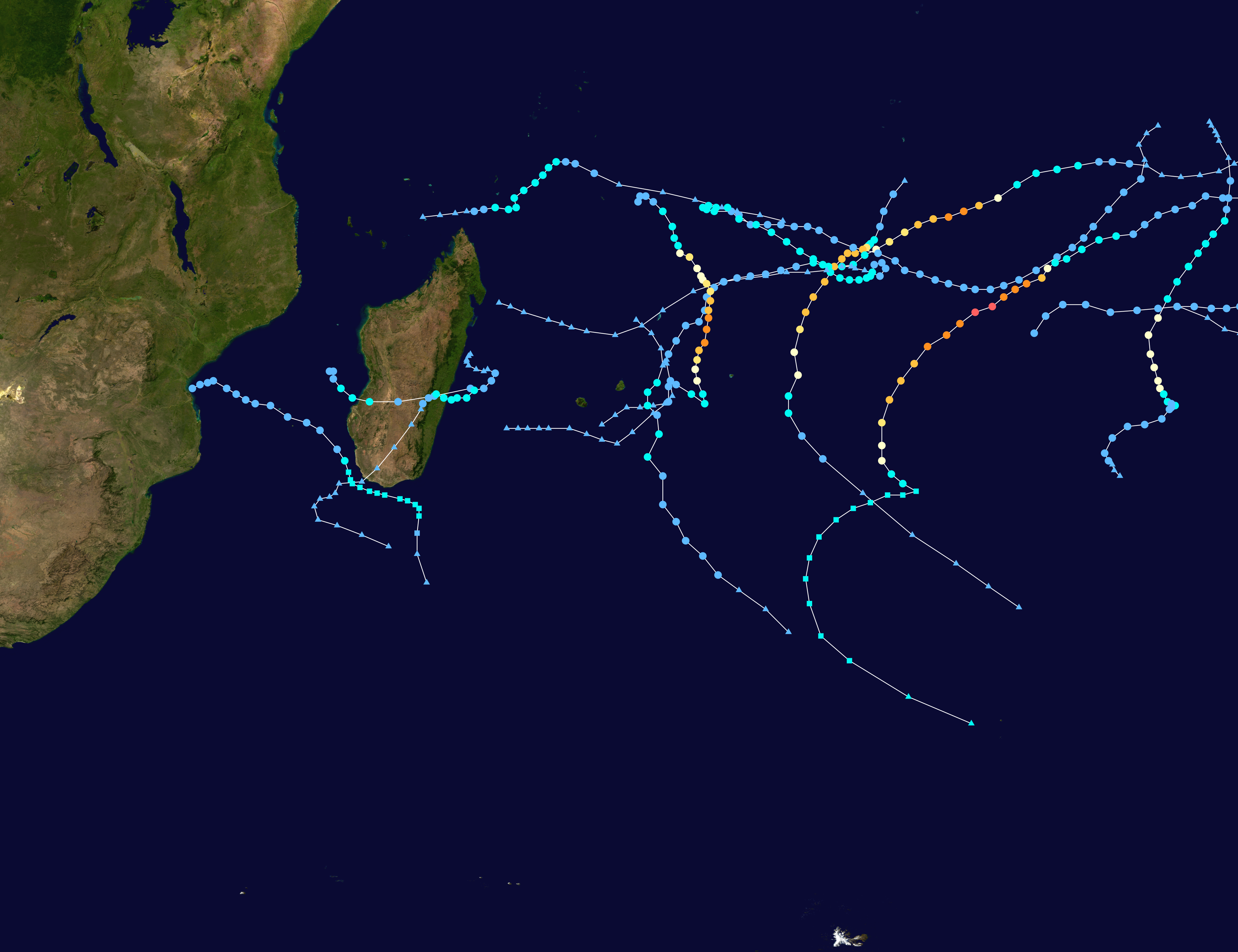
- Season summary map

Season boundaries
- First system formed: August 18, 2009
- Last system dissipated: May 29, 2010

Strongest system
- Name: Edzani
- Maximum winds: 220 km/h (140 mph) (10-minute sustained)
- Lowest pressure: 910 hPa (mbar)

Longest lasting system
- Name: David
- Duration: 13 days
Storm articles
- Tropical Storm Hubert
- Cyclone Robyn

This timeline documents all of the events of the 2009–10 South-West Indian Ocean cyclone season which is the period that tropical cyclones formed in the Indian Ocean. Within the Indian Ocean most tropical cyclones form within the cyclone season which began on November 1 and will end on April 30. The scope of this article is limited to tropical cyclones that form in the Indian Ocean 30°E and 90°E to the south of the equator. When a zone of disturbed weather form or moves into the South-West Indian Ocean it is assigned a number and monitored by Météo-France who run the Regional Specialized Meteorological Center (RSMC) on Réunion Island. Should a tropical disturbance intensify and become a moderate tropical storm the two sub-regional tropical cyclone Advisory Centres in Mauritius and Madagascar in conjunction with RSMC La Réunion. The United States Joint Typhoon Warning Center (JTWC) also issue warnings on tropical cyclones in this region assigning a number with an "S" suffix. When monitoring a tropical cyclone the Joint Typhoon Warning Center will assess the cyclones intensity on the Saffir–Simpson hurricane scale whilst RSMC La Réunion, Mauritius and Madagascar use the Southwest Indian Ocean Tropical Cyclone Intensity Scale to assess a tropical cyclones intensity.

== Timeline ==
=== July ===
July 1

- 0000 UTC, (0400 RET) — The 2009–10 South-West Indian Ocean tropical cyclone year starts.

=== August ===
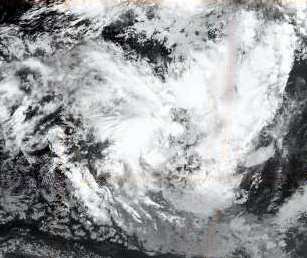
Tropical Disturbance 01

August 18

- 0000 UTC, (0400 RET) — RSMC La Réunion reports that Tropical Disturbance One has formed about 1200 km, (750 mi), to the east of Diego Garcia.
- 1200 UTC, (1600 RET) — RSMC La Réunion issues its final advisory on Tropical Disturbance One as it weakens into a zone of disturbed weather.

=== September ===
September 20

- 0600 UTC, (1000 RET) — RSMC La Réunion reports that Zone of Disturbed Weather Two has formed about 2500 km, (1550 mi), to the Southeast of Jakarta, Indonesia.
- 1200 UTC, (1600 RET) — RSMC La Réunion issues its final advisory on Zone of Disturbed Weather Two.

=== October ===
- No tropical cyclones formed in the South-West Indian Ocean, during October 2009.

=== November ===
November 7

- 1200 UTC, (1600 RET) — RSMC La Réunion reports that Tropical Disturbance Three has formed about 800 km, (500 mi), to the southeast of Male in the Maldives.

November 10

- 0600 UTC, (1000 RET) — RSMC La Réunion issues its final advisory on Tropical Disturbance Three.

November 13

- 0600 UTC, (1030 RET) — RSMC La Réunion reports that Zone of Disturbed Weather Four has formed about 2210 km, (1375 mi) to the north-east of Saint-Denis on La Réunion Island.
- 1800 UTC, (2230 RET) — RSMC La Réunion reports that Zone of Disturbed Weather Four has intensified into a tropical disturbance.

November 14

- 0000 UTC, (0430 RET) — RSMC La Réunion reports that Tropical Disturbance four has intensified into a tropical depression.
- 0600 UTC, (1030 RET) — The JTWC designates Tropical Depression Four as Tropical Storm 01S.
- 1200 UTC, (1630 RET) — RSMC La Réunion reports that Tropical Depression Four (01S) has intensified into a moderate tropical storm.
- 1800 UTC, (2230 RET) — The sub-regional tropical cyclone advisory center in Mauritius names Moderate Tropical Storm Four (01S) as Anja.
- 1800 UTC, (2230 RET) — RSMC La Réunion reports that Moderate Tropical Storm Anja (01S) has intensified into a severe tropical storm.

November 15

- 0000 UTC, (0430 RET) — The 2009–10 South-West Indian Ocean tropical cyclone season officially begins.
- 0000 UTC, (0430 RET) — The JTWC reports that Tropical Storm Anja (01S) has intensified into a category two tropical cyclone.
- 0600 UTC, (1030 RET) — RSMC La Réunion reports that Severe Tropical Storm Anja (01S) has rapidly intensified into a tropical cyclone.
- 0600 UTC, (1030 RET) — The JTWC reports that Tropical Cyclone Anja (01S) has intensified into a category three tropical cyclone.
- 1200 UTC, (1630 RET) — RSMC La Réunion reports that Tropical Cyclone Anja has reached its 10-minute peak sustained wind speeds of 155 km/h (95 mph).
- 1200 UTC, (1630 RET) — The JTWC reports that Tropical Cyclone Anja (01S) has reached its 1-minute peak sustained wind speeds of 195 km/h (120 mph).

November 17

- 0600 UTC, (1030 RET) — The JTWC reports that Tropical Cyclone Anja has weakened into a category two tropical cyclone.
- 1200 UTC, (1630 RET) — The JTWC reports that Tropical Cyclone Anja has weakened into a category one tropical cyclone.
- 1800 UTC, (2230 RET) — RSMC La Réunion reports that Tropical Cyclone Anja (01S) has weakened into a severe tropical storm.

November 18

- 0000 UTC, (0430 RET) — The JTWC reports that Tropical Cyclone Anja has weakened into a Tropical Storm.
- 0600 UTC, (1030 RET) — RSMC La Réunion reports that Severe Tropical Storm Anja (01S) has weakened into a tropical depression.
- 0600 UTC, (1030 RET) — The JTWC reports that Tropical Storm Anja has become extra-tropical and issues its final advisory.
- 1200 UTC, (1630 RET) — RSMC La Réunion reports that Tropical Depression Anja has weakened into a tropical disturbance.

November 20

- 0000 UTC, (0430 RET) — RSMC La Réunion issues its final advisory on Tropical Disturbance Anja.
- 0600 UTC, (1030 RET) — RSMC La Réunion reports that Zone of Disturbed Weather Five has formed about 1525 km, (950 mi), to the north-east of Saint-Denis on La Réunion Island.

November 22

- 0000 UTC, (0430 RET) — RSMC La Réunion reports that Zone of Disturbed Weather Five has intensified into a tropical disturbance.
- 1800 UTC, (2230 RET) — RSMC La Réunion reports that Tropical Disturbance Five has intensified, into a tropical depression.

November 23

- 0000 UTC, (0400 RET) — RSMC La Réunion reports that Tropical Depression Five has intensified into a moderate tropical storm.
- 0600 UTC, (1000 RET) — The sub-regional tropical cyclone advisory center in Madagascar names Moderate Tropical Storm Five as Bongani.
- 0600 UTC, (1000 RET) — RSMC La Réunion reports that Moderate Tropical Storm Bongani has reached its peak 10-minute sustained wind speeds of 75 km/h (45 mph).
- 0600 UTC, (1000 RET) — The JTWC designates Moderate Tropical Storm Bongani as Tropical Storm 02S, has reached its peak one-minute sustained wind speeds of 75 km/h (45 mph).

November 24

- 0000 UTC, (0400 RET) — RSMC La Réunion reports that Moderate Tropical Storm Bongani (02S) has weakened into a tropical depression.
- 0600 UTC, (1000 RET) — RSMC La Réunion reports that Tropical Depression Bongani (02S) has weakened into a tropical disturbance.

November 25

- 0600 UTC, (1000 RET) — RSMC La Réunion reports that Tropical Disturbance Bongani (02S) has weakened into a depression se comblant.
- 1200 UTC, (1600 RET) — The JTWC reports that Tropical Storm Bongani (02S) has weakened into a tropical depression.

November 26

- 1200 UTC, (1600 RET) — RSMC La Réunion issues the final advisory on Depression Se Comblant Bongani.

=== December ===
December 3

- 0600 UTC, (1000 RET) — RSMC La Réunion reports that Zone of Disturbed Weather 06, has formed within the Australian region.

December 4

- 2100 UTC — Zone of disturbed weather 06 moves into the South-West Indian Ocean.

December 6

- 0000 UTC — RSMC La Réunion reports that Zone of Disturbed Weather 06 has intensified into a tropical disturbance.

December 7

- 0000 UTC — The JTWC designates Tropical Disturbance 06 as Tropical Storm 03S.
- 0600 UTC — RSMC La Réunion reports that Tropical Disturbance 06 (03S) has intensified into a tropical depression.
- 1200 UTC — RSMC La Réunion reports that Tropical Depression 06 (03S) has intensified into a moderate tropical storm.
- 1200 UTC — The sub-regional tropical cyclone advisory centre in Mauritius names Moderate Tropical Storm 06 (03S) as Cleo.

December 8

- 0000 UTC — RSMC La Réunion reports that Moderate Tropical Storm Cleo (03S) has intensified into a severe tropical storm.
- 0000 UTC — The JTWC reports that Tropical Storm Cleo (03S) has intensified into a category one tropical cyclone.
- 0600 UTC — RSMC La Réunion reports that Severe Tropical Storm has rapidly intensified into an intense tropical cyclone.
- 0600 UTC — The JTWC reports that Tropical Cyclone Cleo (03S) has intensified into a category three tropical cyclone.
- 1200 UTC — RSMC La Réunion reports that Intense Tropical Cyclone Cleo (03S) has reached its 10-minute sustained peak wind speeds of 195 km/h, (120 mph).
- 1200 UTC — The JTWC reports that Tropical Cyclone Cleo (03S) has intensified into a category four tropical cyclone.
- 1200 UTC — The JTWC reports that Tropical Cyclone Cleo (03S) has reached its 1-minute sustained peak wind speeds of 210 km/h, (130 mph).

December 9

- 0000 UTC — RSMC La Réunion reports that Intense Tropical Cyclone Cleo (03S) has weakened into a tropical cyclone.
- 0000 UTC — The JTWC reports that Tropical Cyclone Cleo (03S) has weakened into a category three tropical cyclone.
- 1200 UTC — RSMC La Réunion reports that Tropical Cyclone Cleo (03S) has weakened into a severe tropical storm.
- 1200 UTC — The JTWC reports that Tropical Cyclone Cleo (03S) has weakened into a category two tropical cyclone.

December 10

- 0000 UTC — The JTWC reports that Tropical Cyclone Cleo (03S) has weakened into a category one tropical cyclone.
- 0600 UTC — The JTWC reports that Tropical Cyclone Cleo (03S) has weakened into a tropical storm.
- 1800 UTC — RSMC La Réunion reports that Tropical Cyclone Cleo (03S) has weakened into a tropical storm.

December 11

- 0600 UTC — RSMC La Réunion reports that Tropical Cyclone Cleo (03S) has weakened into a tropical disturbance.
- 1200 UTC — The JTWC reports that Tropical Storm Cleo (03S) has weakened into a tropical depression.

December 12

- 0000 UTC — RSMC La Réunion reports that Tropical Disturbance Cleo has intensified into a tropical depression.
- 0600 UTC — RSMC La Réunion reports that Tropical Depression Cleo has weakened into a tropical disturbance.
- 1200 UTC — RSMC La Réunion reports that Tropical Disturbance Cleo has weakened into a zone of disturbed weather.
- 1200 UTC — RSMC La Réunion reports that Zone of Disturbed Weather 07 has formed about 1660 km, (1000 mi), to the south-east of Colombo, Sri Lanka.

December 13

- 0600 UTC — RSMC La Réunion reports that Zone of Disturbed Weather Cleo has re-intensified into a tropical disturbance.
- 0600 UTC — RSMC La Réunion reports that Zone of Disturbed Weather 07 has intensified into a tropical disturbance.
- 0600 UTC — The JTWC designates Tropical Disturbance 07 as Tropical Storm 05S.

December 14

- 0000 UTC — RSMC La Réunion reports that Tropical Disturbance 07 has weakened into a zone of disturbed weather.
- 0000 UTC — The JTWC issues their final advisory on Tropical Depression Cleo.
- 0600 UTC — The JTWC reports that Tropical Storm 05S has weakened into a tropical depression.
- 1200 UTC — RSMC La Réunion reports that Tropical Disturbance Cleo has weakened into a zone of disturbed weather.

December 17

- 0600 UTC — RSMC La Réunion reports that Zone of Disturbed Weather 07 has intensified into a tropical disturbance.

December 20

- 0600 UTC — The JTWC reports that Tropical Depression 05S has intensified into a Tropical Storm.

December 21

- 0600 UTC — RSMC La Réunion reports that Tropical Disturbance 07 (05S) has intensified into a tropical depression.
- 1200 UTC — RSMC La Réunion reports that Tropical Depression 07 (05S) has intensified into a moderate tropical storm.
- 1200 UTC — The sub-regional tropical cyclone advisory centre in Mauritius names Moderate Tropical Storm 07 (05S) as David.

December 22

- 1800 UTC — RSMC La Réunion reports that Moderate Tropical Storm David (05S) has intensified into a severe tropical storm.

December 23

- 0000 UTC — RSMC La Réunion reports that Severe Tropical Storm David (05S) has reached its 10-minute sustained peak wind speeds of 100 km/h, (65 mph).
- 1800 UTC — RSMC La Réunion reports that Severe Tropical Storm David (05S) has weakened into a tropical storm.

December 24

- 0600 UTC — RSMC La Réunion reports that Moderate Tropical Storm David (05S) has intensified into a severe tropical storm.

December 25

- 0000 UTC — RSMC La Réunion reports that Severe Tropical Storm David (05S) has weakened into a tropical storm.
- 1200 UTC — RSMC La Réunion reports that Tropical Storm David (05S) has weakened into a tropical depression.
- 1200 UTC — The JTWC reports that Tropical Storm 05S has weakened into a tropical depression.
- 1800 UTC — RSMC La Réunion reports that Tropical Depression David (05S) has weakened into a tropical disturbance.

December 26

- 1200 UTC — RSMC La Réunion reports that Tropical Disturbance David has weakened into a zone of disturbed weather.

December 30

- 0000 UTC — The JTWC issues their final advisory on Tropical Depression David (05S).

=== January ===
January 3

- 0600 UTC — RSMC La Réunion reports that Tropical Disturbance 08, has formed within the Australian region.

January 4

- 0300 UTC — Tropical Disturbance 08 moves into the South-West Indian Ocean from the Australian region.

January 5

- 1800 UTC — RSMC La Réunion reports that Tropical Disturbance 08 has intensified into a Tropical Depression.

January 6

- 0000 UTC — The JTWC designates Tropical Depression 08 as Tropical Storm 07S.
- 0600 UTC — RSMC La Réunion reports that Tropical Disturbance 08 (07S) has intensified into a moderate tropical storm.
- 0600 UTC — The sub-regional tropical cyclone advisory centre in Mauritius names Moderate Tropical Storm 08 (07S) as Edzani.

January 7

- 0000 UTC — RSMC La Réunion reports that Moderate Tropical Storm Edzani (07S) has intensified into a severe tropical storm.
- 0600 UTC — RSMC La Réunion reports that Severe Tropical Storm Edzani (07S) has intensified into a tropical cyclone.
- 0600 UTC — The JTWC reports that Tropical Storm Edzani (07S) has intensified into a category one tropical cyclone.
- 1200 UTC — RSMC La Réunion reports that Tropical Cyclone Edzani (07S) has intensified into an intense tropical cyclone.
- 1200 UTC — The JTWC reports that Tropical Cyclone Edzani (07S) has intensified into a category three tropical cyclone.
- 1800 UTC — The JTWC reports that Tropical Cyclone Edzani (07S) has intensified into a category four tropical cyclone.

January 8

- 0600 UTC — RSMC La Réunion reports that Intense Tropical Cyclone Edzani (07S) has intensified into a very intense tropical cyclone.
- 0600 UTC — RSMC La Réunion reports that Very Intense Tropical Cyclone Edzani (07S) has reached its 10-minute sustained peak wind speeds of 220 km/h, (140 mph).
- 1200 UTC — The JTWC reports that Tropical Cyclone Edzani (07S) has intensified into a category five tropical cyclone.
- 1200 UTC — The JTWC reports that Tropical Cyclone Edzani (07S) has reached its 1-minute sustained peak wind speeds of 260 km/h, (160 mph).
- 1800 UTC — The JTWC reports that Tropical Cyclone Edzani (07S) has weakened into a category four tropical cyclone.

January 9

- 0000 UTC — RSMC La Réunion reports that Very Intense Tropical Cyclone Edzani has weakened into an intense tropical cyclone.
- 1200 UTC — The JTWC reports that Tropical Cyclone Edzani (07S) has weakened into a category three tropical cyclone.

January 10

- 0000 UTC — RSMC La Réunion reports that Intense Tropical Cyclone Edzani has weakened into a tropical cyclone.
- 1200 UTC — The JTWC reports that Tropical Cyclone Edzani (07S) has weakened into a category two tropical cyclone.
- 1800 UTC — The JTWC reports that Tropical Cyclone Edzani (07S) has weakened into a category one tropical cyclone.

January 11

- 0000 UTC — RSMC La Réunion reports that Tropical Cyclone Edzani has weakened into a severe tropical storm.
- 0600 UTC — The JTWC reports that Tropical Cyclone Edzani (07S) has weakened into a tropical storm.
- 1200 UTC — RSMC La Réunion reports that Tropical Cyclone Edzani has weakened into a tropical storm.

January 12

- 0000 UTC — RSMC La Réunion reports that Tropical Storm Edzani has weakened into a subtropical storm.

January 14

- 1800 UTC — RSMC La Réunion reports that Subtropical Storm Edzani has weakened into an extra-tropical storm.
- 1800 UTC — Both the JTWC and RSMC La Réunion issue their final advisory on Subtropical Depression Edzani (07S) as its weakens into an extra-tropical storm.

January 15

- 0600 UTC — RSMC La Réunion reports that Tropical Disturbance 09 has formed about 500 km, (300 mi), to the south-west of Saint-Denis, on La Réunion Island.
- 1200 UTC — RSMC La Réunion reports that Tropical Disturbance 09 has weakened into a zone of disturbed weather.

January 26

- 1800 UTC — RSMC La Réunion reports that Zone of Disturbed Weather 10 has formed about 500 km, (300 mi), to the north-west of Saint-Denis, on La Réunion Island.

January 27

- 1800 UTC — RSMC La Réunion reports that Zone of Disturbed Weather 10 has intensified into a Tropical Disturbance.
- 1800 UTC — The JTWC designates Tropical Depression 10 as Tropical Storm 11S.

January 28

- 1200 UTC — The JTWC reports that Tropical Storm 11S has weakened into a tropical depression.
- 1800 UTC — The JTWC reports that Tropical Depression 11S has re-intensified into a tropical storm.

January 29

- 0600 UTC — RSMC La Réunion reports that Tropical Disturbance 10 (11S) has weakened into a Subtropical Depression.
- 0600 UTC — The JTWC reports that Tropical Storm 11S has weakened into a tropical depression.
- 1200 UTC — RSMC La Réunion reports that Subtropical Depression has intensified into a Subtropical Storm.
- 1200 UTC — RSMC La Réunion reports that Subtropical Storm 10 (11S) has reached its peak wind speeds of 65 km/h (40 mph).
- 1800 UTC — RSMC La Réunion reports that Subtropical Storm 10 (11S) has weakened into a Subtropical Depression.
- 1800 UTC — The JTWC reports that Tropical Depression 11S has re-intensified into a tropical storm.

January 30

- 0600 UTC — The JTWC reports that Tropical Storm 11S has weakened into a tropical depression.
- 1200 UTC — Both the JTWC and RSMC La Réunion issue their final advisory on Subtropical Depression 10 (11S).

=== February ===
February 1

- 0600 UTC — RSMC La Réunion reports that Tropical Disturbance 11 has formed about 600 km, (370 mi), to the east of Antananarivo in Madagascar.

February 2

- 0000 UTC — RSMC La Réunion reports that Tropical Disturbance 11 has intensified into a tropical depression.
- 0600 UTC — RSMC La Réunion reports that Tropical Depression 11 has intensified into a moderate tropical storm.
- 0600 UTC — The sub-regional tropical cyclone advisory centre in Madagascar names Moderate Tropical Storm 11 as Fami.
- 0600 UTC — The JTWC designates Moderate Tropical Storm Fami as Tropical Storm 13S.
- 0900 UTC — RSMC La Réunion reports that Moderate Tropical Storm Fami (13S) has made landfall on the western Madagascar coast in the vicinity of Belo.
- 1200 UTC — RSMC La Réunion downgrades Moderate Tropical Storm Fami (13S) to an overland depression.
- 1800 UTC — The JTWC reports that Tropical Storm Fami (13S) has weakened into a tropical depression.
- 2100 UTC — The JTWC issues their final advisory on Tropical Depression Fami (13S) as it dissipates over Madagascar.

February 3

- 0000 UTC — RSMC La Réunion issues their final advisory on overland depression Fami as it dissipates over Madagascar.

February 15

- 0600 UTC — RSMC La Réunion reports that Tropical Disturbance 12 has formed about 1250 km, (775 mi), to the north-east of Saint-Denis, on La Réunion Island.

February 16

- 0000 UTC — RSMC La Réunion reports that Tropical Disturbance 12 has intensified into a tropical depression.
- 0000 UTC — The JTWC designates Tropical Depression 12 as Tropical Storm 16S.
- 0600 UTC — RSMC La Réunion reports that Tropical Depression 12 (16S) has intensified into a moderate tropical storm.
- 0900 UTC — The sub-regional tropical cyclone advisory centre in Mauritius names Moderate Tropical Storm 12 (16S) as Gelane.

February 17

- 0000 UTC — RSMC La Réunion reports that Moderate Tropical Storm Gelane (16S) has intensified into a severe tropical storm.
- 0000 UTC — The JTWC reports that Tropical Storm Gelane (16S) has intensified into a category one tropical cyclone.
- 0600 UTC — RSMC La Réunion reports that Severe Tropical Storm Gelane (16S) has intensified into a tropical cyclone.

February 18

- 0600 UTC — The JTWC reports that Tropical Cyclone Gelane (16S) has intensified into a category two tropical cyclone.
- 1800 UTC — The JTWC reports that Tropical Cyclone Gelane (16S) has intensified into a category three tropical cyclone.

February 19

- 0600 UTC — RSMC La Réunion reports that Tropical Cyclone Gelane (16S) has intensified into an intense tropical cyclone.
- 0600 UTC — The JTWC reports that Tropical Cyclone Gelane (16S) has intensified into a category four tropical cyclone.
- 1200 UTC — RSMC La Réunion reports that Intense Tropical Cyclone Gelane (16S) has reached its 10-minute peak sustained wind speeds of 205 km/h (125 mph).
- 1200 UTC — The JTWC reports that Tropical Cyclone Gelane (16S) has reached its 1-minute peak sustained wind speeds of 230 km/h (145 mph).

February 20

- 0000 UTC — The JTWC reports that Tropical Cyclone Gelane (16S) has weakened into a category three tropical cyclone.
- 0300 UTC — RSMC La Réunion reports that Intense Tropical Cyclone Gelane (16S) has weakened into a tropical cyclone.
- 0600 UTC — The JTWC reports that Tropical Cyclone Gelane (16S) has weakened into a category two tropical cyclone.
- 1200 UTC — RSMC La Réunion reports that Tropical Cyclone Gelane (16S) has weakened into a severe tropical storm.
- 1200 UTC — The JTWC reports that Tropical Cyclone Gelane (16S) has weakened into a category one tropical cyclone.
- 1800 UTC — The JTWC reports that Tropical Cyclone Gelane (16S) has weakened into a tropical storm.

February 21

- 1200 UTC — RSMC La Réunion reports that Severe Tropical Storm Gelane (16S) has weakened into a moderate tropical storm.
- 1800 UTC — RSMC La Réunion reports that Moderate Tropical Storm Gelane (16S) has weakened into a tropical disturbance.

February 22

- 1200 UTC — RSMC La Réunion reports that Tropical Disturbance Gelane (16S) has weakened into a Depression se comblant Gelane (16S).

February 25

- 0600 UTC — RSMC La Réunion issues their last advisory on Depression se comblant Gelane (16S).

=== March ===
March 9

- 0600 UTC — RSMC La Réunion reports that Tropical Disturbance 13 has formed between Madagascar and Réunion
- 1800 UTC — RSMC La Réunion reports that Tropical Disturbance 13 has intensified into a tropical depression

March 10

- 1200 UTC — RSMC La Réunion reports that Tropical Depression 13 has intensified into a moderate tropical storm.
- 1200 UTC — The sub-regional tropical cyclone advisory centre in Madagascar names Moderate Tropical Storm 13 as Hubert.
- 1800 UTC — RSMC La Réunion reports that Moderate Tropical Storm Hubert has intensified into a severe tropical storm.
- 2100 UTC — RSMC La Réunion reports that Severe Tropical Storm Hubert has made landfall on the eastern Madagascar coast in the vicinity of Mananjary.

March 11

- 0000 UTC — RSMC La Réunion downgrades Moderate Tropical Storm Hubert to an overland depression.
- 1200 UTC — RSMC La Réunion issues their final advisory on overland depression Hubert as it dissipates over Madagascar.

March 22

- 1200 UTC — RSMC La Réunion reports that Tropical Disturbance 14 has formed close to 90ºE
- 1800 UTC — RSMC La Réunion reports that Tropical Disturbance 14 has intensified into a tropical depression

March 23

- 1800 UTC — RSMC La Réunion reports that Tropical Depression 14 has intensified into a moderate tropical storm.
- 1800 UTC — The sub-regional tropical cyclone advisory centre in Mauritius names Moderate Tropical Storm 14 as Imani.

March 24

- 1200 UTC — RSMC La Réunion reports that Moderate Tropical Storm Imani has intensified into a severe tropical storm.

March 25

- 0600 UTC — RSMC La Réunion reports that Severe Tropical Storm Imani has intensified into a tropical cyclone.

=== April ===
April 7

- 0600 UTC — The remnants of Severe Tropical Cyclone Robyn enter this basin as Filling Depression 15

=== May ===
May 26

- 0600 UTC — RSMC La Réunion reports that Subtropical Depression 16 has formed SW of Madagascar
- 1200 UTC — RSMC La Réunion reports that Subtropical Depression 16 has strengthened and is named Joel

== See also ==
- List of Southern Hemisphere tropical cyclone seasons
- Atlantic hurricane season timelines: 2009, 2010
- Pacific hurricane season timelines: 2009, 2010
- Pacific typhoon season timelines: 2009, 2010
- Timeline of the 2009 North Indian Ocean cyclone season
- Timeline of the 2009–10 Australian region cyclone season
- Timeline of the 2009–10 South Pacific cyclone season
