= Tropical Storm Hubert =

Severe Tropical Storm Hubert
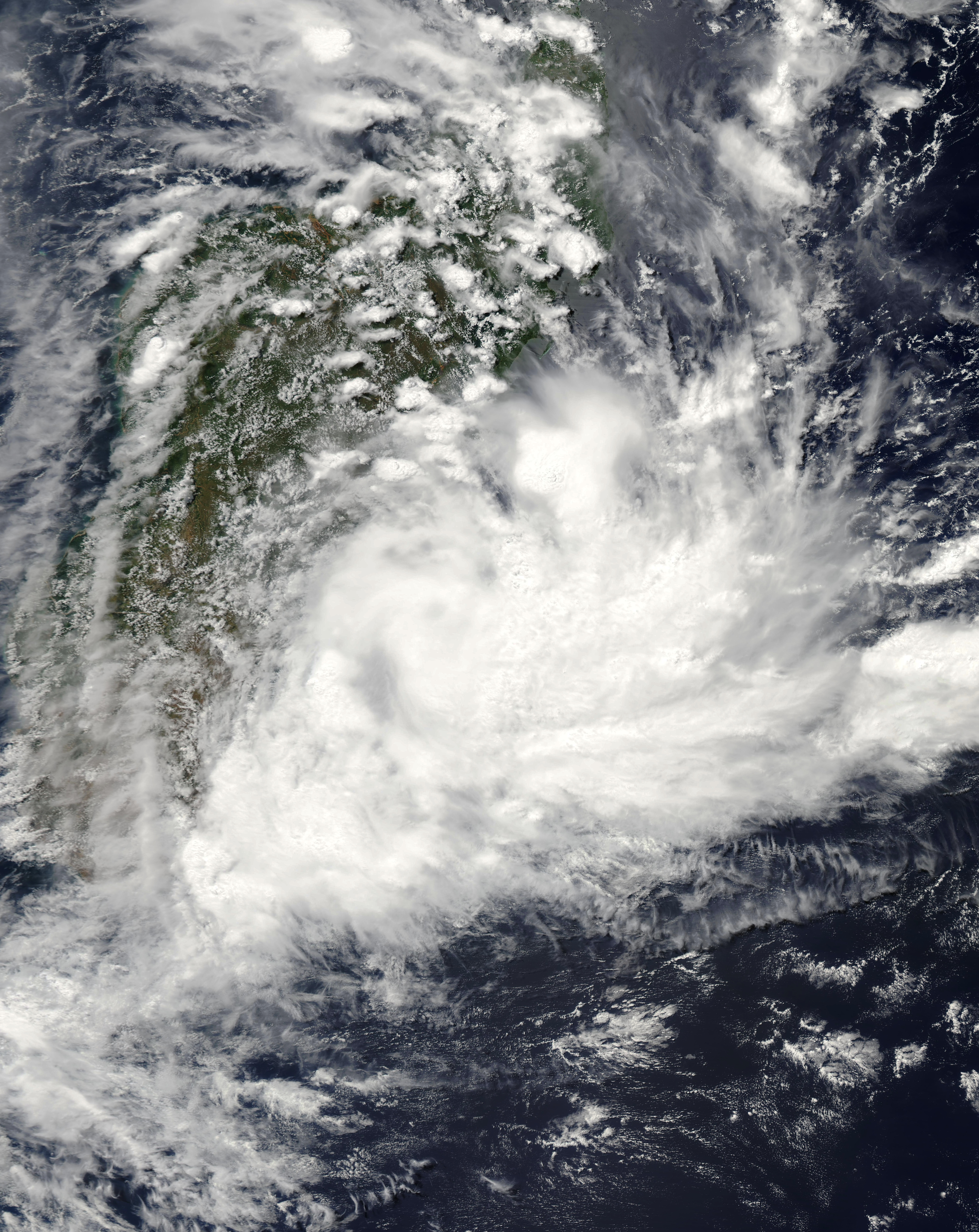
- Tropical Storm Hubert at peak intensity just off the coast of Madagascar on March 10

Meteorological history
- Formed: March 9, 2010
- Dissipated: March 15, 2010

Severe tropical storm
- 10-minute sustained (MFR)
- Highest winds: 100 km/h (65 mph)
- Lowest pressure: 985 hPa (mbar); 29.09 inHg

Tropical storm
- 1-minute sustained (SSHWS/JTWC)
- Highest winds: 95 km/h (60 mph)
- Lowest pressure: 985 hPa (mbar); 29.09 inHg

Overall effects
- Fatalities: 85
- Missing: 35
- Areas affected: Madagascar
- IBTrACS
- Part of the 2009–10 South-West Indian Ocean cyclone season

Severe Tropical Storm Hubert was a destructive tropical cyclone that killed 85 people throughout Madagascar early March 2010. Forming out of a slow-moving area of low pressure on March 9, Hubert quickly developed within a region favoring tropical development. As the storm was situated off the coast of Madagascar on March 10, it would attain peak winds of 100 km/h (65 mph) hours before making landfall near Mananjary in Fianarantsoa Province. Rapid weakening took place once inland, with the storm losing gale-force winds late on March 11. The remnants of Hubert would persist for several days, eventually dissipating off the southern coast of Madagascar on March 15.

Throughout much of central Madagascar, Hubert produced heavy rains, peaking at 137.5 mm (5.41 in) in Mananjary, that caused widespread flooding. Thousands of structures were destroyed by the ensuing floods and more than 66,000 people were left homeless.

== Meteorological history ==
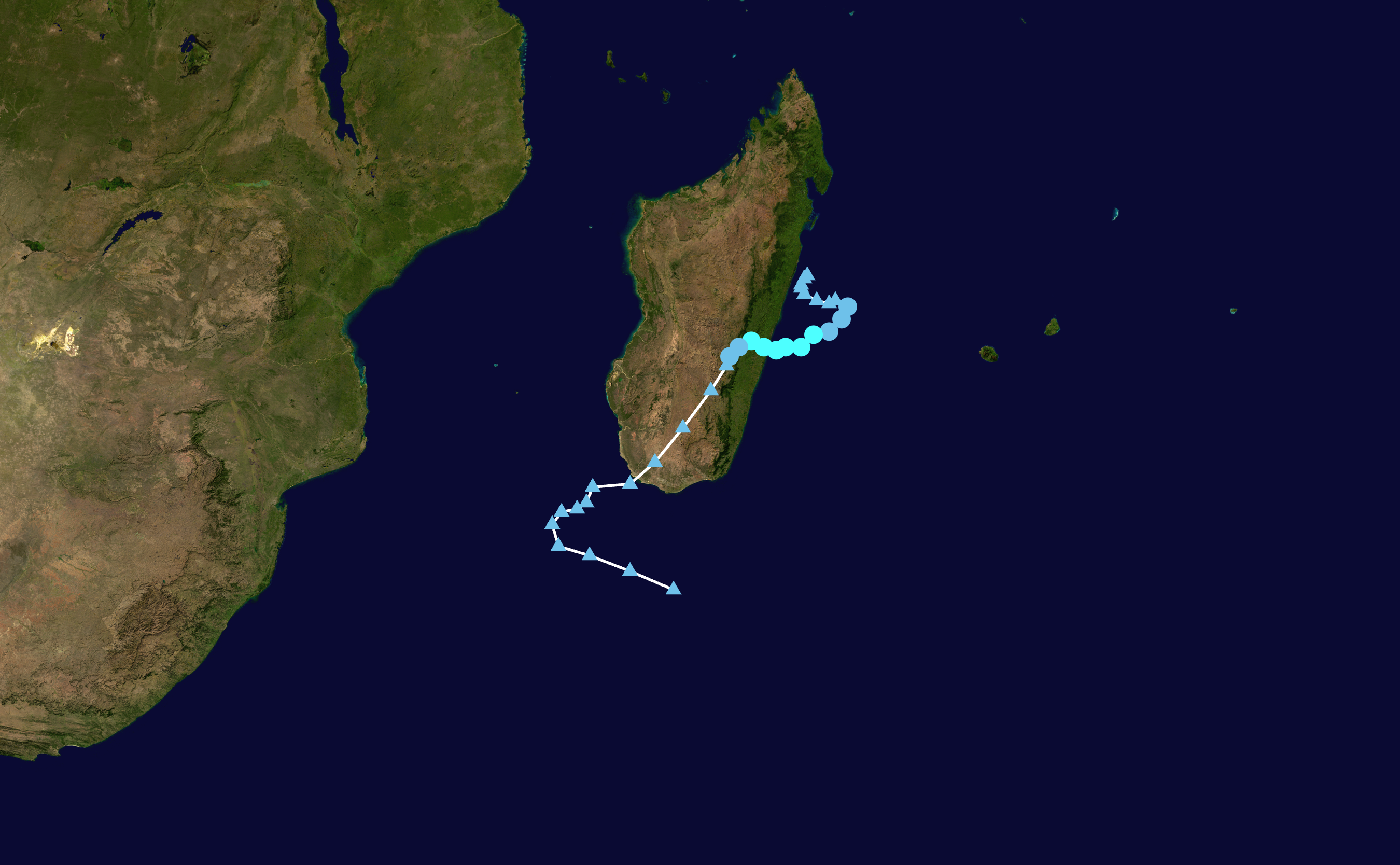
Map plotting the storm's track and intensity, according to the Saffir–Simpson scale Map key Saffir–Simpson scale Tropical depression (≤38 mph, ≤62 km/h) Tropical storm (39–73 mph, 63–118 km/h) Category 1 (74–95 mph, 119–153 km/h) Category 2 (96–110 mph, 154–177 km/h) Category 3 (111–129 mph, 178–208 km/h) Category 4 (130–156 mph, 209–251 km/h) Category 5 (≥157 mph, ≥252 km/h) Unknown Storm type Tropical cyclone Subtropical cyclone Extratropical cyclone, remnant low, tropical disturbance, or monsoon depression

Severe Tropical Storm Hubert was first identified as an area of low pressure off the northeastern coast of Madagascar on March 5, 2010. Slowly tracking south-southwestward, the system paralleled the eastern shore of Madagascar for several days. On March 9, the Regional Specialized Meteorological Center for the South-West Indian Ocean basin, Météo-France, classified the low as a tropical depression, the 13th of the season. Situated in a region of weak steering currents, the depression was quasi-stationary and environmental conditions, low wind shear and good divergence, favored gradual development. Within hours of this, the Joint Typhoon Warning Center (JTWC) issued a Tropical Cyclone Formation Alert for the depression. The formation of convective banding features took place throughout the day and intensification into a moderate tropical storm was anticipated. Though convection tended to fluctuate, a general organizing trend was apparent. Early on March 10, the JTWC classified the system as Tropical Cyclone 18S as deep convection consolidated around the storm's center.

Around 1200 UTC on March 10, Météo-France upgraded the system to a moderate tropical storm and assigned it with the name Hubert. This corresponded with the early stages of eye formation, as the storm's outer bands wrapped tightly around the center of circulation. Previously quasi-stationary, Hubert gained a southwesterly track in response to a ridge to its south. Rapid intensification ensued in the hours before the cyclone made landfall in Madagascar. Just six hours after being named, Hubert attained its peak intensity as a severe tropical storm with winds of 100 km/h (65 mph) along with a barometric pressure of 985 mbar (hPa; 29.09 inHg). At this time, the storm's radius of maximum winds was 17 km (11 mi). The JTWC assessed the system to have been slightly weaker, reporting peak winds of 85 km/h (50 mph). Around 2100 UTC, the center of Hubert moved onshore near the city of Mananjary in Fianarantsoa Province. Once overland, the storm abruptly turned northwestward and rapidly weakened as sustained winds dropped below gale-force.

During the latter part of March 11, Hubert resumed a southwesterly track along the northwestern edge of the ridge to its south. Operational advisories on the storm indicated that Hubert would continue to deteriorate over Madagascar before moving over the Mozambique Channel where it could regenerate. This forecast never verified as the remnants of the storm failed to redevelop. The circulation remained over Madagascar through March 13 before it moved offshore near the southern tip of the island. Once over water, the system temporarily had a more westerly tracking component before it turned southeastward. The remnants of Hubert were last noted on March 15 to the south of Madagascar.

== Impact ==
Upon making landfall in Madagascar, Tropical Storm Hubert unleashed heavy rains and hurricane-force winds. A peak gust of 145 km/h (90 mph) was recorded in Manajary. The highest 24‑hour rainfall of 137.5 mm (5.41 in) was recorded in the same city. Seven districts in the country were significantly affected by the storm, with thousands of residents cut off from outside areas as roads were washed away. Numerous bridges were destroyed and land access to many towns was impossible months after the storm passed. Wells were contaminated by the floods, prompting fears that an ongoing outbreak of Chikungunya would spread more rampantly. At least 85 people are known to have been killed by the storm and another 35 listed as missing. Additionally, 132 people sustained storm-related injuries. According to reports in early April, an estimated 66,000 people were left homeless by the storm.

== See also ==
- 2009–10 South-West Indian Ocean cyclone season
- Timeline of the 2009–10 South-West Indian Ocean cyclone season
