= Timeline of the 2009–10 Australian region cyclone season =

The 2009–10 Australian region cyclone season was a below average tropical cyclone season, with eight tropical cyclones forming compared to an average of 12. The season began on 1 November 2009 and ran through until it end on 30 April 2010. The Australian region is defined as being to south of the equator, between the 90th meridian east and 160th meridian east. Tropical cyclones in this area are monitored by five Tropical Cyclone Warning Centres (TCWC's): Jakarta, Port Moresby, Perth, Darwin, and Brisbane, each of which have the power to name a tropical cyclone. The TCWC's in Perth, Darwin, and Brisbane are run by the Australian Bureau of Meteorology, who designate significant tropical lows with a number and the U suffix. The Joint Typhoon Warning Center also issues unofficial warnings for the region, designating significant tropical cyclones with the "S" suffix when they form west of 135°E, and the "P" suffix when they form east of 135°E.

== Timeline ==
=== December ===
10 December
- 0600 UTC — TCWC Darwin reports that Tropical Low 01U has formed northeast of Darwin.

13 December
- 0000 UTC — TCWC Darwin reports that Tropical Low 01U has become a Category One Tropical Cyclone and is named as Cyclone Laurence.

14 December
- 2100 UTC — TCWC Darwin upgrades Tropical Cyclone Laurence to a Category 2 cyclone.

15 December
- 0300 UTC — TCWC Darwin upgrades Tropical Cyclone Laurence to a Category 3 cyclone.
- 1800 UTC — TCWC Perth upgrades Laurence into a Category 4 cyclone.

16 December
- 0000 UTC — TCWC Perth upgrades Severe Tropical Cyclone Laurence to a Category 5.
- 0300 UTC — TCWC Perth downgrades Laurence to a Category 3 cyclone.
- 2100 UTC — TCWC Perth downgrades Laurence to a Category 2 cyclone.

17 December
- 2100 UTC — TCWC Perth downgrades Laurence to Category 1 strength.

18 December
- 1200 UTC — TCWC Perth downgrades Laurence to a Tropical Low.

19 December
- 0400 UTC — TCWC Perth re-upgrades Tropical Low Laurence to a Category 1 cyclone.
- 1600 UTC — TCWC Perth re-upgrades Tropical Cyclone Laurence to a Category 2 cyclone.

20 December
- 1500 UTC — TCWC Perth re-upgrades Laurence to a Category 3 cyclone.
- 2000 UTC — TCWC Perth re-upgrades Severe Tropical Cyclone Laurence to a Category 4 cyclone.

21 December
- 0300 UTC — TCWC Perth re-upgrades Laurence to a Category 5 cyclone.
- 1200 UTC — TCWC Perth downgrades Laurence to a Category 4 cyclone.
- 2000 UTC — TCWC Perth downgrades Laurence to a Category 3 cyclone.

22 December
- 0700 UTC — TCWC Perth downgrades Tropical Cyclone Laurence to a Category 2 cyclone.
- 1200 UTC — TCWC Perth downgrades Laurence to a Category 1 cyclone.

23 December
- 1200 UTC - TCWC Perth downgrades Laurence to a Tropical low.
- 1200 UTC - TCWC Perth issues its final warning to Ex-Tropical Cyclone Laurence.

27 December
- 0600 UTC – TCWC Darwin reports that Tropical Low 02U has formed in the southern Arafura Sea

=== January ===
1 January
- 0600 UTC – TCWC Perth reports that Tropical Low 03U has formed near 8S 96E

16 January
- 0700 UTC – TCWC Darwin reports that Tropical Low 05U has formed in the Gulf of Carpentaria

19 January
- 0600 UTC – TCWC Perth reports that Tropical Low 06U has formed south of Timor

20 January
- 1500 UTC – TCWC Perth upgrades Tropical Low 06U to a category one tropical cyclone and names it Magda.
- 1800 UTC – TCWC Brisbane upgrades Tropical Low 05U to a category one tropical cyclone and names it Neville.
- 2100 UTC – The Joint Typhoon Warning Center issues its first warning on Tropical Cyclone 08S (Magda).

21 January
- 0100 UTC – TCWC Perth upgrades Tropical Cyclone Magda to Category 2 strength.
- 0100 UTC – TCWC Brisbane downgrades Tropical Cyclone Neville to a Tropical Low.

22 January
- 2000 UTC – TCWC Perth downgrades Tropical Cyclone Magda, to a tropical low.
- 2300 UTC – TCWC Brisbane issues their final warning for Tropical Low Ex-Neville.
- 2300 UTC – TCWC Perth issues their final warning for Tropical Low Ex-Magda.
- 2300 UTC – TCWC Brisbane upgrades 07U to category 1 Tropical Cyclone Olga.

23 January
- 1200 UTC – TCWC Brisbane upgrades Tropical Cyclone Olga to Category 2 strength.

24 January
- 0000 UTC – TCWC Brisbane downgrades Tropical Cyclone Olga to a Category 1 cyclone.
- 2300 UTC – TCWC Brisbane downgrades Tropical Cyclone Olga to a Tropical low.

29 January
- 1200 UTC – TCWC Brisbane upgrades Tropical Low Ex-Olga back to a Category 1 cyclone.

30 January
- 0000 UTC – TCWC Brisbane downgrades Tropical Cyclone Olga to a Tropical low.

=== March ===
14 March

- 1800 UTC – TCWC Brisbane issues its first advisory on Severe Tropical Cyclone Ului as it enters the Australian region from the South Pacific
- 1800 UTC – TCWC Brisbane reports that Severe Tropical Cyclone Ului has weakened into a category 4 severe tropical cyclone.

17 March
- 1800 UTC – TCWC Brisbane downgrades Severe Tropical Cyclone Ului to a Category 3 cyclone.

19 March
- 0000 UTC – TCWC Brisbane downgrades Severe Tropical Cyclone Ului to a Category 2 cyclone.

20 March
- 0600 UTC – TCWC Brisbane upgrades Tropical Cyclone Ului to a Category 3 severe cyclone.
- 1530 UTC – Severe Tropical Cyclone Ului makes landfall near Airlie Beach, Queensland
- 1800 UTC – TCWC Brisbane downgrades Severe Tropical Cyclone Ului to a Category 2 cyclone.

28 March
- 0130 UTC – TCWC Darwin upgrades the Tropical Low in the Arafura Sea to Category 1 Tropical Cyclone.

29 March
- 0100 UTC – TCWC Darwin upgrades Tropical Cyclone Paul to a Category 2 cyclone.
- 1200 UTC – Tropical Cyclone Paul makes landfall south of Cape Shield in north-east Arnhem Land.

30 March
- 0130 UTC – TCWC Darwin downgrades Tropical Cyclone Paul to a Category 1 cyclone.

=== April ===
2 April
- 0600 UTC – TCWC Perth reports that Tropical Low 12U has formed west of Cocos Island.

3 April
- 0000 UTC – TCWC Perth upgrades Tropical Low 12U to Category 1 Tropical Cyclone Robyn.

4 April
- 0600 UTC – TCWC Perth upgrades Tropical Cyclone Robyn to a Category 2 cyclone.

5 April
- 0000 UTC – TCWC Perth upgrades Robyn to a Category 3 Severe Tropical Cyclone.
- 0600 UTC – TCWC Perth downgrades Severe Tropical Cyclone Robyn to a Category 2 cyclone.

6 April
- 0000 UTC – TCWC Perth downgrades Tropical Cyclone Robyn to a Category 1 cyclone.
- 0600 UTC – TCWC Perth downgrades Tropical Cyclone Robyn to a Tropical low.

7 April
- 0600 UTC – ex-Tropical Cyclone Robyn leaves the Australian zone of responsibility as a Tropical low.

21 April
- 1200 UTC – TCWC Perth reports that Tropical Low 13U has formed, about 130 nm south of Bali

== See also ==
- 2009–10 Australian region cyclone season
- Timeline of the 2009 Atlantic hurricane season
- Timeline of the 2009 Pacific hurricane season
- Timeline of the 2009 Pacific typhoon season
- Timeline of the 2009 North Indian Ocean cyclone season
- Timeline of the 2009–10 South-West Indian Ocean cyclone season
- Timeline of the 2009–10 South Pacific cyclone season
