= Timeline of the 2009–10 South Pacific cyclone season =

Timeline of the 2009-10 South Pacific cyclone season
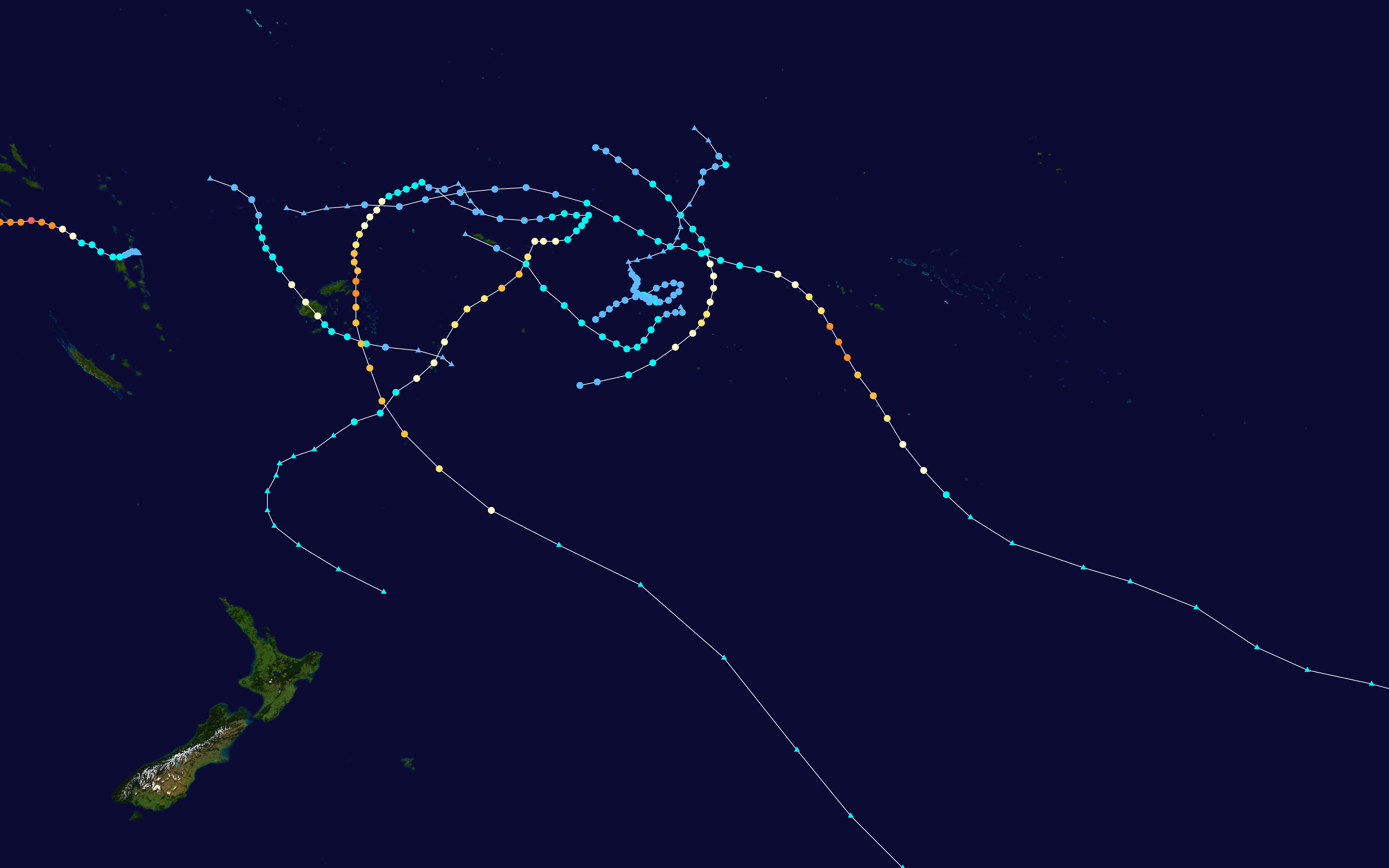
- Season summary map

Season boundaries
- First system formed: December 3, 2009
- Last system dissipated: April 5, 2010

Longest lasting system
- Name: Sarah
- Duration: 14 days
Storm articles
- Cyclone Oli
- Cyclone Pat
- Cyclone Ului
- Cyclone Tomas

This timeline documents all of the events of the 2009–10 South Pacific cyclone season which is the period that tropical cyclones formed in the southern Pacific Ocean. Within the Southern Pacific Ocean, most tropical cyclones form within the cyclone season which began on November 1 and will end on April 30, though occasionally cyclones form outside these times. The scope of this article is limited to tropical cyclones that form in the Indian Ocean 160°E and 120°W to the south of the equator. Should a tropical cyclone form to the west of 160°E then it will be monitored within the Australian region by the Australian Bureau of Meteorology, should a tropical cyclone form to the east of 120°W, it is unclear how it will be handled as no tropical cyclone has ever been observed in the South Pacific Ocean east of 120°W.

When a Tropical Disturbance forms or moves into the South Pacific, it is assigned a number and monitored by Météo-France who run the Regional Specialized Meteorological Center (RSMC) on Réunion Island. Should a tropical disturbance intensify and become a moderate tropical storm the two sub-regional tropical cyclone Advisory Centres in Maurtius and Madagascar in conjunction with RSMC La Réunion. The United States Joint Typhoon Warning Center (JTWC) also issue warnings on tropical cyclones in this region assigning a number with an "S" suffix. When monitoring a tropical cyclone the Joint Typhoon Warning Center will assess the cyclones intensity on the Saffir–Simpson Hurricane Scale whilst RSMC La Réunion, Maurtius and Madagascar use the Southwest Indian Ocean Tropical Cyclone Intensity Scale to assess a tropical cyclones intensity.

== Timeline ==
=== November ===
November 1

- 0000 UTC, (1200 FST) — The 2009–10 South Pacific cyclone season officially begins. (Note: UTC stands for Coordinated Universal Time.) (Note: FST stands for Fiji Standard Time, which is UTC+12.)
- There were no tropical disturbances in the South Pacific during November.

=== December ===
December 3

- 1800 UTC, (0700 FDST, December 4) (Note: From November 29, 2009, until March 28, 2010, Fiji observed daylight saving time (FDST) and as a result moved from UTC+12 to UTC+13.) — RSMC Nadi reports that Tropical Disturbance 01F, has formed about 1015 km, (700 mi), to the north of Suva, Fiji.

December 6

- 1800 UTC, (0700 FDST, December 7) — RSMC Nadi reports that Tropical Disturbance 02F, has formed about 1000 km, (620 mi), to the north of Suva, Fiji.

December 11

- 1800 UTC, (0700 FDST, December 12) — RSMC Nadi reports that Tropical Disturbance 01F, has intensified into a tropical depression.
- 2100 UTC, (1000 FDST, December 12) — RSMC Nadi issues its last advisory on Tropical Disturbance 02F.

December 12

- 1200 UTC, (1300 FDST, December 13) — The JTWC designates Tropical Depression 01F, as Tropical Storm 04P.
- 2300 UTC, (1200 FDST, December 13) — RSMC Nadi reports that Tropical Depression 01F (04P) has intensified into a category one tropical cyclone and names it Mick.

December 13

- 2100 UTC, (1000 FDST, December 14) — RSMC Nadi reports that Tropical Cyclone Mick (04P), has intensified into a category two tropical cyclone.
- 2100 UTC, (1000 FDST, December 14) — Tropical Cyclone Mick makes landfall on the Yasawa Islands.
- 2300 UTC, (1200 FDST, December 14) — Tropical Cyclone Mick makes landfall on Viti Levu.

December 14

- 0000 UTC, (1300 FDST) — RSMC Nadi reports that Tropical Cyclone Mick (04P), has reached its 10-minute peak sustained wind speeds of 110 km/h, (70 mph).
- 0000 UTC, (1300 FDST) — The JTWC reports that Tropical Storm Mick (04P) has intensified into a category one tropical cyclone.
- 0000 UTC, (1300 FDST) — The JTWC reports that Tropical Storm Mick (04P) has reached its 1-minute peak sustained wind speeds of 130 km/h, (80 mph).
- 1200 UTC, (0100 FDST, December 15) — The JTWC reports that Tropical Cyclone Mick has weakened into a tropical storm.
- 1500 UTC, (0400 FDST, December 15) — RSMC Nadi reports that Tropical Cyclone Mick (04P), has weakened into a category one cyclone.
- 1800 UTC, (0700 FDST, December 15) — Tropical Cyclone Mick makes landfall on Matuku Island

December 15

- 0900 UTC (2200 FDST) — RSMC Nadi reports that Tropical Cyclone Mick has weakened into a depression.
- 0900 UTC (2200 FDST) — Depression Mick makes landfall on Vatoa.
- 1800 UTC (0700 FDST, December 16) — RSMC Nadi downgrades Depression Mick to an area of low pressure.
- 1800 UTC (0700 FDST, December 16) — The JTWC reports that Tropical Cyclone Mick has weakened into a tropical depression.
- 1800 UTC (0700 FDST, December 16) — The JTWC issues its final advisory on Mick.

=== January ===
January 7

- 0000 UTC (1300 FDST) — RSMC Nadi reports that Depression 03F has formed about 770 km (480 mi), to the south-west of Papeete in French Polynesia.

January 10

- 0600 UTC (1900 FDST) — RSMC Nadi issues their final advisory on Depression 03F.

January 18

- 1800 UTC (0700 FDST, January 19) — RSMC Nadi reports that Tropical Disturbance 04F has formed about 1300 km (810 mi) to the north-west of Suva, Fiji.

January 19

- 0600 UTC (1900 FDST) — RSMC Nadi reports that Tropical Disturbance 04F has intensified into a Tropical Depression.

January 20

- 0000 UTC (1300 FDST) — Tropical Depression 04F makes landfall on Ulawa Island.
- 0300 UTC (1500 FDST) — Tropical Depression 04F makes landfall on San Cristobal Island.
- 0900 UTC (2200 FDST) — Tropical Depression 04F makes landfall on Bellona Island.

January 21

- 0600 UTC (1900 FDST) — RSMC Nadi issues their final advisory on Tropical Depression 04F as the depression moves into the Australian Region.

January 23

- 2100 UTC, (1000 FDST, January 24) — RSMC Nadi reports that Tropical Disturbance 05F, has formed about 850 km (530 mi) to the north-east of Suva, Fiji.

January 25

- 1800 UTC, (0700 FDST, January 26) — RSMC Nadi reports that Tropical Disturbance 05F, has intensified into a tropical depression.

January 27

- 0900 UTC (2200 FDST) — RSMC Nadi reports that Tropical Depression 06F has formed on the island of Upolu, about 25 km (15 mi) to the south-east of Apia.
- 1200 UTC, (0100 FDST, January 28) — The JTWC designates Tropical Depression 06F as Tropical Storm 10P.
- 1500 UTC, (0300 FDST, January 28) — RSMC Nadi reports that Tropical Depression 06F (10P), has intensified into a category one tropical cyclone and names it as Nisha.

January 28

- 0600 UTC, (1900 FDST) — RSMC Nadi issues its final advisory on Tropical Depression 05F as it weakens into a tropical disturbance.
- 0600 UTC, (1900 FDST) — RSMC Nadi reports that Tropical Cyclone Nisha (10P), has reached its 10-minute peak sustained wind speeds of 75 km/h (45 mph).
- 1200 UTC, (0100 FDST, January 29) — The JTWC reports that Tropical Storm Nisha (10P), has reached its 1-minute peak sustained wind speeds of 95 km/h, (55 mph).

January 29

- 0600 UTC, (1900 FDST) — RSMC Nadi reports that Tropical Disturbance 07F, has formed about 45 km, (30 mi), to the north-west of the Fijian Dependency of Rotuma.
- 1200 UTC, (0100 FDST, January 30) — RSMC Nadi reports that Tropical Cyclone Nisha (10P), has weakened into a tropical depression.

January 30

- 1200 UTC, (0100 FDST, January 31) — The JTWC issues their final advisory on Tropical Storm Nisha (10P).

January 31

- 0900 UTC, (2200 FDST) — RSMC Nadi reports that Tropical Disturbance 07F, has intensified into a tropical depression.
- 1800 UTC, (0700 FDST, February 1) — RSMC Nadi issues their final advisory on Tropical Depression Nisha (10P).

=== February ===
February 1

- 0000 UTC, (1300 FDST) — The JTWC designates Tropical Depression 07F as Tropical Storm 12P.
- 0900 UTC, (2200 FDST) — RSMC Nadi reports that Tropical Depression 07F (12P), has intensified into a category one tropical cyclone and names it Oli.
- 1500 UTC, (0400 FDST, February 2) — Tropical Cyclone Oli (12P), makes landfall on Suwarrow island.
- 1800 UTC, (0700 FDST, February 2) — RSMC Nadi reports that Tropical Cyclone Oli (12P), has intensified into a category two tropical cyclone.

February 2

- 0600 UTC, (1900 FDST) — RSMC Nadi reports that Tropical Cyclone Oli (12P), has weakened into a category one tropical cyclone.
- 0900 UTC, (2200 FDST) — RSMC Nadi reports that Tropical Depression 08F has formed about 140 km, (85 mi), to the north-west of Toau Island in French Polynesia.
- 1500 UTC, (0400 FDST, February 3) — Tropical Depression 08F makes landfall on Toau Island.

February 3

- 0600 UTC, (1900 FDST) — RSMC Nadi reports that Tropical Cyclone Oli (12P), has re-intensified into a category two tropical cyclone.
- 0600 UTC, (1900 FDST) — The JTWC reports that Tropical Storm Oli (12P), has intensified into a category one tropical cyclone.
- 1800 UTC, (0700 FDST, February 4) — RSMC Nadi reports that Tropical Cyclone Oli (12P), has intensified into a category three severe tropical cyclone.
- 2100 UTC, (1000 FDST, February 4) — Tropical Cyclone Oli (12P), makes landfall on the Society Island of Maupihaa.

February 4

- 0600 UTC, (0700 FDST) — RSMC Nadi passes primary warning responsibility for Tropical Depression 08F to TCWC Wellington.
- 0600 UTC, (1900 FDST) — The JTWC reports that Tropical Cyclone Oli (12P), has intensified into a category two tropical cyclone.
- 1200 UTC, (0100 FDST, February 5) — RSMC Nadi reports that Tropical Cyclone Oli (12P), has intensified into a category four severe tropical cyclone.
- 1200 UTC, (0000 FDST, February 5) — RSMC Nadi reports that Tropical Cyclone Oli (12P), has reached its 10-minute peak sustained wind speeds of 185 km/h (115 mph).
- 1200 UTC, (0000 FDST, February 5) — The JTWC reports that Tropical Cyclone Oli (12P), has intensified into a category four tropical cyclone.
- 1200 UTC, (0000 FDST, February 5) — The JTWC reports that Tropical Cyclone Oli (12P), has reached its 1-minute peak sustained wind speeds of 215 km/h, (135 mph).

February 5

- 0600 UTC, (1900 FDST) — The JTWC reports that Tropical Cyclone Oli (12P), has weakened into a category three tropical cyclone.
- 1800 UTC, (0700 FDST, February 6) — RSMC Nadi reports that Tropical Cyclone Oli (12P), has weakened into a category three severe tropical cyclone.
- 1800 UTC, (0700 FDST, February 6) — RSMC Nadi passes primary warning responsibility for Tropical Cyclone Oli (12P) to TCWC Wellington.
- 1800 UTC, (0700 FDST, February 6) — TCWC Wellington issues the final warning on Tropical Depression 08F.
- 1800 UTC, (0700 FDST, February 6) — The JTWC reports that Tropical Cyclone Oli (12P), has weakened into a category two tropical cyclone.

February 6

- 0600 UTC, (1900 FDST) — TCWC Wellington reports that Tropical Cyclone Oli (12P), has weakened into a category two tropical cyclone.
- 0600 UTC, (1900 FDST) — The JTWC reports that Tropical Cyclone Oli (12P), has weakened into a category one tropical cyclone.
- 1200 UTC, (0100 FDST, February 5) — The JTWC reports that Tropical Cyclone Oli (12P), has weakened into a tropical storm.
- 1800 UTC, (0700 FDST, February 7) — RSMC Nadi reports that Tropical Depression 09F has formed about 800 km, (500 mi), to the north-east of Apia, Samoa.
- 1800 UTC, (0700 FDST, February 5) — TCWC Wellington reports that Tropical Cyclone Oli (12P), has weakened into an extra-tropical low.

February 7

- 0000 UTC, (1300 FDST) — The JTWC issues its final advisory on Tropical Storm Oli (12P).
- 1800 UTC, (0700 FDST, February 8) — The JTWC designates Tropical Depression 09F as Tropical Storm 14P.

February 8

- 0000 UTC, (1300 FDST) — RSMC Nadi reports that Tropical Depression 09F has intensified into a category one tropical cyclone and names it Pat.
- 1800 UTC, (0700 FDST, February 9) — RSMC Nadi reports that Tropical Cyclone Pat has intensified into a category two tropical cyclone.
- 1800 UTC, (0700 FDST, February 9) — TCWC Wellington issues its final advisory on Tropical Cyclone Oli (12P), as it moves to the east of 120°W.

February 9

- 0600 UTC, (1900 FDST) — The JTWC reports that Tropical Storm Pat (14P) has intensified into a category one tropical cyclone.
- 1500 UTC, (0400 FDST, February 10) — RSMC Nadi reports that Tropical Depression 10F has formed about 100 km (60 mi) to the north-west of Apia, Samoa.

February 10

- 0300 UTC, (1600 FDST) — RSMC Nadi reports that Tropical Cyclone Pat has intensified into a category three severe tropical cyclone.
- 0300 UTC, (1600 FDST) — RSMC Nadi reports that Severe Tropical Cyclone Pat has reached its 10-minute peak sustained wind speeds of 140 km/h, (85 mph).
- 0600 UTC, (1900 FDST) — The JTWC reports that Tropical Cyclone Pat (14P) has intensified into a category two tropical cyclone.
- 1200 UTC, (0100 FDST, February 11) — The JTWC reports that Tropical Cyclone Pat (15P) has intensified into a category three tropical cyclone.
- 1200 UTC, (0100 FDST, February 11) — The JTWC reports that Severe Tropical Cyclone Pat has reached its 1-minute peak sustained wind speeds of 200 km/h, (120 mph).
- 1500 UTC, (0400 FDST, February 11) — Severe Tropical Cyclone Pat passes over the island of Aitutaki in the Cook Islands.
- 1800 UTC, (0700 FST, February 11) — The JTWC reports that Tropical Cyclone Pat (15P) has weakened into a category one tropical cyclone.

February 11

- 0000 UTC, (1300 FDST) — RSMC Nadi reports that Severe Tropical Cyclone Pat has weakened into a category two tropical cyclone.
- 0000 UTC, (1300 FDST) — The JTWC designates Tropical Depression 10F as Tropical Storm 15P.
- 0600 UTC, (1900 FDST) — RSMC Nadi reports that Tropical Cyclone Pat has weakened into a category one tropical cyclone.
- 0600 UTC, (1900 FDST) — The JTWC reports that Tropical Cyclone Pat (15P) has weakened into a Tropical Storm.
- 0900 UTC, (2200 FDST) — RSMC Nadi reports that Tropical Depression 10F (15P) has intensified into a category one tropical cyclone and names it as Rene.
- 1800 UTC, (0700 FDST, February 12) — RSMC Nadi reports that Tropical Cyclone Pat has weakened into an area of low pressure.
- 1800 UTC, (0700 FDST, February 12) — RSMC Nadi reports that Tropical Cyclone Rene (15P) has intensified into a category two tropical cyclone.

February 12

- 0000 UTC, (1300 FDST) — The JTWC reports that Tropical Cyclone Pat (15P) has weakened into a Tropical Depression.
- 0000 UTC, (1300 FDST) — The JTWC issues their final advisory on Tropical Depression Pat (15P).

February 13

- 0000 UTC, (1300 FDST) — The JTWC reports that Tropical Storm Rene (15P) has intensified into a category one tropical cyclone.
- 0600 UTC, (1900 FDST) — RSMC Nadi reports that Tropical Cyclone Rene (15P) has intensified into a category three severe tropical cyclone.
- 1200 UTC, (0100 FDST, February 14) — Severe Tropical Cyclone Rene (15P) passes over the island of Tau, American Samoa.
- 1200 UTC, (0100 FDST, February 14) — The JTWC reports that Tropical Cyclone Rene (15P) has intensified into a category two tropical cyclone.
- 1800 UTC, (0700 FDST, February 14) — The JTWC reports that Tropical Cyclone Rene (15P) has intensified into a category three tropical cyclone.
- 1800 UTC, (0700 FDST, February 14) — The JTWC reports that Tropical Cyclone Rene (15P) has reached its 1-minute peak sustained wind speeds of 165 km/h, (115 mph).

February 14

- 0600 UTC, (1900 FDST) — RSMC Nadi reports that Severe Tropical Cyclone Rene (15P) has intensified into a category four severe tropical cyclone.
- 0600 UTC, (1900 FDST) — RSMC Nadi reports that Severe Tropical Cyclone Rene (15P) has reached its 10-minute peak sustained wind speeds of 165 km/h, (105 mph).
- 0600 UTC, (1900 FDST) — The JTWC reports that Tropical Cyclone Rene (15P) has weakened into a category two tropical cyclone.

February 15

- 0000 UTC, (0100 FDST) — The JTWC reports that Tropical Cyclone Rene (15P) has weakened into a category one tropical cyclone.
- 0200 UTC, (1500 FDST) — Severe Tropical Cyclone Rene (15P) makes landfall on Oua Island, Tonga.
- 0400 UTC, (1700 FDST) — Severe Tropical Cyclone Rene (15P) makes landfall on Mango Island, Tonga.
- 0600 UTC, (1900 FDST) — RSMC Nadi reports that Severe Tropical Cyclone Rene (15P) has weakened into a category three severe tropical cyclone.
- 0900 UTC, (2200 FDST) — Severe Tropical Cyclone Rene (15P) makes landfall on Tongatapu, Tonga.
- 1800 UTC, (0700 FDST, February 16) — RSMC Nadi reports that Severe Tropical Cyclone Rene (15P) has weakened into a category two tropical cyclone.
- 1800 UTC, (0700 FDST, February 16) — The JTWC reports that Tropical Cyclone Rene (15P) has weakened into a tropical storm.

February 16

- 0900 UTC, (2200 FDST) — RSMC Nadi reports that Tropical Cyclone Rene (15P) has weakened into a category one tropical cyclone.
- 0900 UTC, (2200 FDST) — RSMC Nadi passes primary warning responsibility for Tropical Cyclone Rene (15P) to TCWC Wellington.
- 1200 UTC, (0100 FDST, February 17) — TCWC Wellington reports that Tropical Cyclone Rene (15P) has weakened into an extra-tropical low.

February 17

- 0000 UTC, (1300 FDST) — The JTWC reports that Tropical Storm Rene (15P) has weakened into a Tropical Depression.
- 1800 UTC, (0700 FDST, February 16) — The JTWC issues their final advisory on Tropical Depression Rene (15P).

February 19

- 0600 UTC, (1900 FDST) — TCWC Wellington issues its final advisory on the extra-tropical cyclone Rene (15P).

February 20

- 1800 UTC, (0700 FDST, February 21) — RSMC Nadi reports that Tropical Depression 11F has formed about 1380 km, (855 mi), to the north-west of Apia, Samoa.

February 21

- 1800 UTC, (0700 FDST, February 22) — The JTWC designates Tropical Depression 11F as Tropical Storm 17P.
- 1800 UTC, (0700 FST, February 22) — The JTWC reports that Tropical Storm 17P (11F) has reached its 1-minute peak sustained wind speeds of 65 km/h, (40 mph).

February 22

- 0000 UTC, (1300 FDST) — Tropical Depression 11F makes landfall on Penrhyn Island.
- 1200 UTC, (0100 FDST, February 23) — The JTWC reports that Tropical Storm 17P (11F) has weakened into a tropical depression.
- 1800 UTC, (0700 FDST, February 23) — RSMC Nadi reports that Tropical Depression 11F (17P), has weakened into a low.
- 2100 UTC, (1000 FDST, February 23) — RSMC Nadi reports that the low-pressure area has re-intensified into Tropical Disturbance 11F.

February 23

- 0600 UTC, (1900 FDST) — RSMC Nadi reports that Tropical Disturbance 11F (17P), has weakened into a low.
- 0900 UTC, (2200 FDST) — RSMC Nadi reports that the low-pressure area has re-intensified into Tropical Disturbance 11F.
- 1800 UTC, (0700 FDST, February 24) — RSMC Nadi reports that Tropical Disturbance 11F (17P), has intensified into a tropical depression.

February 26

- 1300 UTC, (0200 FDST, February 27) — RSMC Nadi reports that Tropical Depression 11F (17P), has intensified into a category one tropical cyclone, and names it Sarah.
- 1300 UTC, (0200 FDST, February 27) — RSMC Nadi reports that Tropical Cyclone Sarah (17P) has reached its 10-minute peak sustained wind speeds of 65 km/h, (40 mph).

February 27

- 1200 UTC, (0100 FDST, February 28) — The JTWC reports that Tropical Cyclone Sarah (17P) has re-intensified into a Tropical Storm.

February 28

- 0000 UTC, (1300 FDST) — The JTWC reports that Tropical Storm Sarah (17P) has weakened into a tropical depression.
- 0300 UTC, (1600 FDST) — RSMC Nadi reports that Tropical Cyclone Sarah has weakened into a tropical depression.

=== March ===
March 3

- 0600 UTC, (1800 FDST) — RSMC Nadi issue their final advisory on Tropical Depression Sarah.

March 9

- 1800 UTC, (0600 FDST, March 10) — RSMC Nadi reports that Tropical Disturbance 13F has formed about 650 km (400 mi) to the northeast of Port Vila, Vanuatu.
- 1800 UTC, (0600 FDST, March 10) — RSMC Nadi reports that Tropical Disturbance 14F has formed about 90 km (55 mi) to the northeast of Apia, Samoa.

March 10

- 0900 UTC, (2100 FDST) — RSMC Nadi reports that Tropical Disturbance 13F has intensified into a tropical depression.
- 1800 UTC, (0600 FDST, March 11) — RSMC Nadi reports that Tropical Disturbance 14F has intensified into a tropical depression.

March 11

- 1200 UTC, (0100 FDST, March 12) — The JTWC designates Tropical Depression 14F as Tropical Storm 19P.
- 1800 UTC, (0700 FDST, March 12) — The JTWC designates Tropical Depression 13F as Tropical Storm 20P.

March 12

- 0000 UTC, (1300 FDST) — RSMC Nadi reports that Tropical Depression 14F (19P), has intensified into a category one tropical cyclone, and names it Tomas.
- 1200 UTC, (0100 FDST, March 13) — RSMC Nadi reports that Tropical Depression 13F (20P), has intensified into a category one tropical cyclone, and names it Ului.
- 1200 UTC, (0100 FDST, March 13) — RSMC Nadi reports that Tropical Cyclone Tomas (19P), has intensified into a category two tropical cyclone.
- 1800 UTC, (0700 FDST, March 13) — RSMC Nadi reports that Tropical Cyclone Ului has intensified into a category two tropical cyclone.

March 13

- 0000 UTC, (1300 FDST) — The JTWC reports that Tropical Storm Tomas (19P), has intensified into a category one tropical cyclone.
- 1200 UTC, (0100 FDST, March 14) — RSMC Nadi reports that Tropical Cyclone Ului (20P), has intensified into a category three severe tropical cyclone.
- 1800 UTC, (0700 FDST, March 14) — RSMC Nadi reports that Severe Tropical Cyclone Ului (20P), has intensified into a category four severe tropical cyclone.

March 14

- 0000 UTC, (1300 FDST) — RSMC Nadi reports that Tropical Cyclone Tomas (19P), has intensified into a category three severe tropical cyclone.
- 0000 UTC, (1300 FDST) — RSMC Nadi reports that Severe Tropical Cyclone Ului (20P), has intensified into a category five severe tropical cyclone.
- 0000 UTC, (1300 FDST) — The JTWC reports that Tropical Cyclone Tomas (19P), has intensified into a category two tropical cyclone.
- 1200 UTC, (0100 FDST, March 15) — RSMC Nadi passes primary warning responsibility for Ului to TCWC Brisbane as it moves into the Australian region.
- 1200 UTC, (0100 FDST, March 14) — The JTWC reports that Tropical Cyclone Tomas (19P), has intensified into a category three tropical cyclone.
- 1800 UTC, (0700 FDST, March 14) — RSMC Nadi reports that Severe Tropical Cyclone Tomas (19P), has intensified into a category four severe tropical cyclone.

March 15

- 0600 UTC, (1800 FDST) — The JTWC reports that Tropical Cyclone Tomas (19P), has intensified into a category four tropical cyclone.
- 0600 UTC, (1800 FDST) — The JTWC reports that Tropical Cyclone Tomas (19P), has reached its 1-minute peak sustained wind speeds of 215 km/h, (135 mph).
- 1800 UTC, (0700 FDST, March 16) — The JTWC reports that Tropical Cyclone Tomas (19P), has weakened into a category three tropical cyclone.

March 16

- 1800 UTC, (0700 FDST, March 17) — The JTWC reports that Tropical Cyclone Tomas (19P), has re-intensified into a category four tropical cyclone.
- 1800 UTC, (0700 FDST, March 17) — The JTWC reports that Tropical Cyclone Tomas (19P), has reattained its 1-minute peak sustained wind speeds of 215 km/h, (135 mph).

March 17

- 0000 UTC, (1200 FDST) — The JTWC reports that Tropical Cyclone Tomas (19P), has re-weakened into a category three tropical cyclone.
- 0600 UTC, (1800 FDST) — The JTWC reports that Tropical Cyclone Tomas (19P), has weakened into a category one tropical cyclone.
- 1200 UTC, (0000 FDST, March 18) — The JTWC reports that Tropical Cyclone Tomas (19P), has re-weakened into a tropical storm.

March 31

- 0000 UTC, (1300 FDST) — RSMC Nadi reports that a Depression has formed about 445 km (280 mi) to the southeast of Port Vila, Vanuatu.
- 2100 UTC, (1000 FDST, April 1) — RSMC Nadi designates the Depression as Tropical Depression 15F.

=== April ===
April 3

- 1200 UTC, (0100 FDST, April 4) — RSMC Nadi passes the primary warning responsibility of Tropical Depression 15F to TCWC Wellington.

April 5

- 1800 UTC, (0700 FDST, April 6) — TCWC Wellington issues its final advisory on Tropical Depression 15F.

== See also ==
- Atlantic hurricane seasons: 2009, 2010
- Pacific hurricane seasons: 2009, 2010
- Pacific typhoon seasons: 2009, 2010
- North Indian Ocean cyclone seasons: 2009, 2010
