= 2010 Pacific typhoon season =

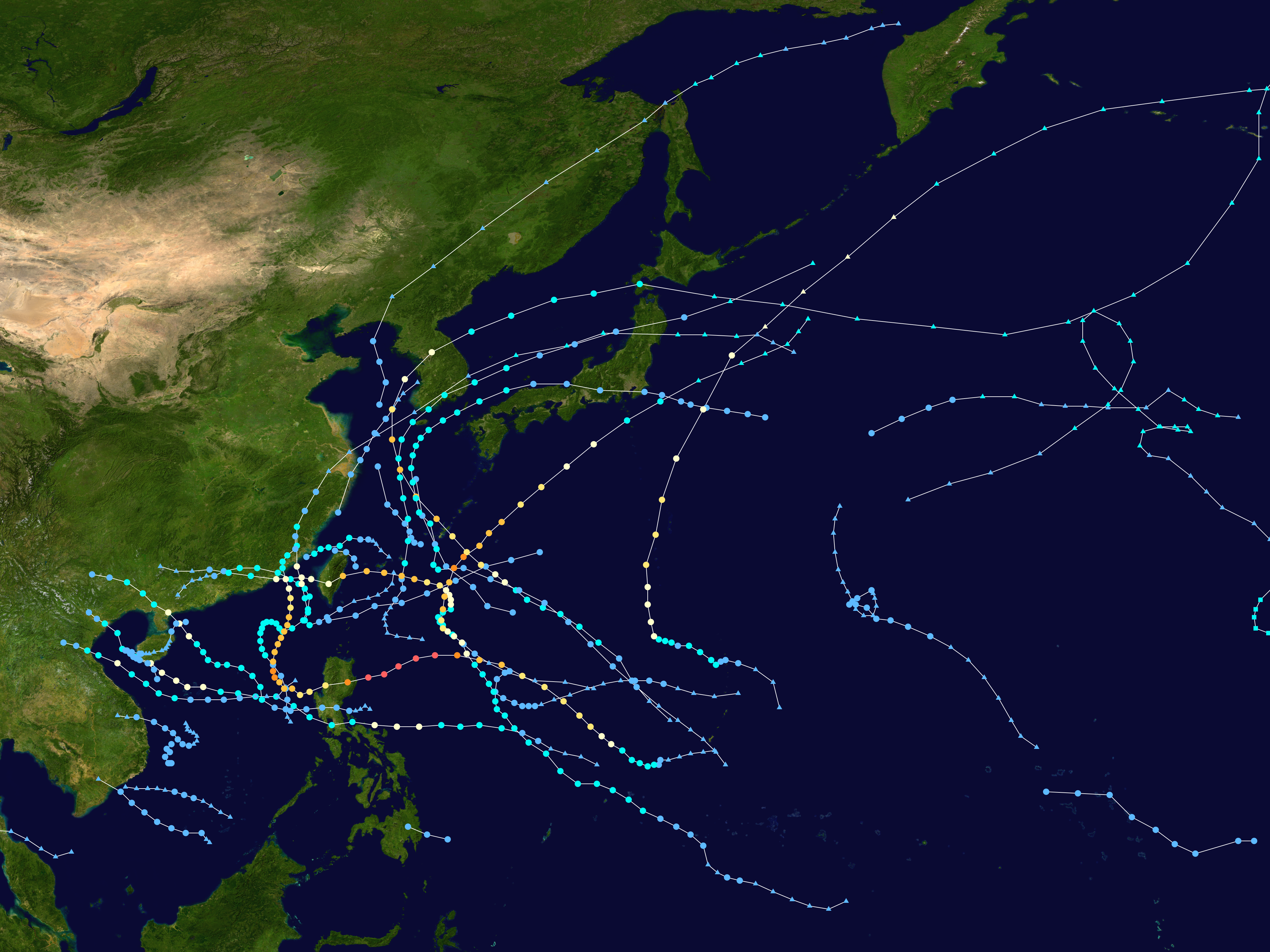
- Season summary map

Seasonal boundaries
- First system formed: January 18, 2010
- Last system dissipated: December 20, 2010

Strongest storm
- Name: Megi
  - Maximum winds: 230 km/h (145 mph) (10-minute sustained)
  - Lowest pressure: 885 hPa (mbar)

Seasonal statistics
- Total depressions: 29
- Total storms: 14, 1 unofficial (record low)
- Typhoons: 7
- Very strong typhoons: 4
- Violent typhoons: 1
- Total fatalities: 384 total
- Total damage: $2.95 billion (2010 USD)

Related articles
- Timeline of the 2010 Pacific typhoon season; 2010 Atlantic hurricane season; 2010 Pacific hurricane season; 2010 North Indian Ocean cyclone season

The 2010 Pacific typhoon season, with 14 named storms, was the least active Pacific typhoon season on record. Seven of them strengthened into typhoons while one reached super typhoon intensity. All of the 14 named storms developed west of 150°E.

The season ran throughout 2010, though most tropical cyclones tend to develop between June and October. The season's first named storm, Omais, developed on March 24 while the season's last named storm, Chaba dissipated or became extratropical on October 30. During the season only three storms were notable. Typhoon Kompasu was the strongest storm to make landfall over in South Korea in 15 years. In September, Typhoon Fanapi struck Taiwan and China, causing heavy damage in the two countries. No storms made landfall in mainland Japan, only the second such occurrence since 1988. During October, Typhoon Megi reached its peak intensity with a minimum barometric pressure of 885 hPa, making it one of the most intense typhoons ever recorded. In addition, a rare subtropical storm had developed during December and intensified into Tropical Storm Omeka where it crossed the basin.

The scope of this article is limited to the Pacific Ocean to the north of the equator between 100°E and 180th meridian. Within the northwestern Pacific Ocean, there are two separate agencies that assign names to tropical cyclones which can often result in a cyclone having two names. The Japan Meteorological Agency (JMA) will name a tropical cyclone should it be judged to have 10-minute sustained wind speeds of at least 65 km/h (40 mph) anywhere in the basin, whilst the Philippine Atmospheric, Geophysical and Astronomical Services Administration (PAGASA) assigns names to tropical cyclones which move into or form as a tropical depression in their area of responsibility located between 135°E and 115°E and between 5°N–25°N regardless of whether or not a tropical cyclone has already been given a name by the JMA. Tropical depressions that are monitored by the United States' Joint Typhoon Warning Center (JTWC) are given a number with a "W" suffix.

== Seasonal forecasts ==
TSR forecasts Date	Tropical storms	Total Typhoons	Intense TCs	ACE	Ref
Average (1965–2009)	26.6	16.6	8.6	299	
March 8, 2010	24.2	14.8	8.1	284	
May 5, 2010	24.1	14.6	9.2	321	
July 6, 2010	23.0	13.6	6.7	236	
August 4, 2010	22.8	13.4	6.1	217	
Other forecasts Date	Forecast Center	Period		Systems	Ref
January 7, 2010	PAGASA	January 1 — December 31		19 tropical cyclones	
June 30, 2010	CWB	January 1 — December 31		20–23 tropical storms	
July 5, 2010	PAGASA	January 1 — December 31		13–15 tropical cyclones	
	Forecast Center	Tropical cyclones	Tropical storms	Typhoons	Ref
Actual activity:	JMA	28	14	7	
Actual activity:	JTWC	19	14	9	
Actual activity:	PAGASA	11	10	5	

Each season several national meteorological services and scientific agencies forecast how many tropical cyclones, tropical storms, and typhoons will form during a season and/or how many tropical cyclones will affect a particular country.

=== City University of Hong Kong ===
Since the 2000 Pacific typhoon season, the Guy Carpenter Asia-Pacific Climate Impact Centre (GCACIC), of the City University of Hong Kong (CityUHK), have issued forecasts of activity for each upcoming typhoon season. Forecasts on the number of tropical cyclones, tropical storms and typhoons there would be during 2010 in the Western Pacific were released in April and June. For the first time this year the GCACIC issued forecasts in May and July, which predicted how many tropical cyclones would make landfall in South China, and pass within 100 km (62 mi) of either the Korean Peninsula or Japan during 2010.

In its April 2010 forecast; GCACIC predicted that 28 tropical cyclones, 24 tropical storms, and 16 typhoons would form in the western north Pacific this year. However, in its June forecast the GCACIC reported that they now only expected 27 tropical cyclones, 23 tropical storms, and 15 typhoons, to form during the season. As a result of their predictions the GCACIC also predicted that tropical cyclone activity would be below average for the twelfth year in a row. In May the GCACIC forecasted that between May and December, six tropical cyclones would make landfall on Southern China and another six tropical cyclones would make landfall on or pass within 100 km (62 mi) of either the Korean Peninsula or Japan. In July the GCACIC forecast that between July and December three tropical cyclones would make landfall on Southern China, while four tropical cyclones would make landfall on or pass within 100 km (62 mi) of either the Korean Peninsula or Japan.

=== Tropical Storm Risk Consortium ===
Since the 2000 Pacific typhoon season, the Tropical Storm Risk Consortium (TSR) of the University College of London have issued forecasts of activity for each upcoming typhoon season. Forecasts on the number of tropical storms, typhoons and intense typhoons there would be during 2010 in the Western Pacific were released in March, May, July and August. (Note: According to TSR: An intense typhoon is a typhoon that has one-minute winds of at least 175 km/h (110 mph)) In its March forecast TSR predicted that the season would see activity close to the average with 26 tropical storms, 16 typhoons and seven intense typhoons developing during the season. In its May forecast, while lowering their initial prediction for the amount of tropical storms and typhoons, TSR continued to predict that the season would see activity close to the average, with 24 tropical storms, 15 typhoons and nine intense typhoons developing during the season. In its July forecast TSR significantly lowered their forecast and reported that they now expected activity to be 20% below average, with 23 tropical storms 14 typhoons and seven intense typhoons developing during the season. In its August forecast TSR predicted that activity would be 25% – 30% below average with 23 tropical storms, 13 typhoons and six intense typhoons developing during the season. TSR also predicted that if their August forecast came true then the season would be in the lowest 25% of seasons.

=== National meteorological service predictions ===
The Philippine Atmospheric, Geophysical and Astronomical Services Administration (PAGASA) reported on January 7 that they were expecting a total of 19 tropical cyclones to pass through the Philippine area of responsibility during 2010. On March 23 the Hong Kong Observatory (HKO), predicted that less than six tropical cyclones would affect Hong Kong during the season. As a result of being under the influence of a weakening El Niño, the HKO also predicted that the chances of a tropical cyclone affecting Hong Kong before June was not high. After Vietnam was hit by Tropical Depression 01W in January, the Vietnamese National Center for Hydro Meteorological forecasts predicted in May that 6–7 tropical cyclones would affect Vietnam during 2010. While the Thai Meteorological Department predicted that one or two tropical cyclones would affect Thailand between August and November. On June 30, the Central Weather Bureau of Taiwan predicted that the 2010 season would be below its normal climatic average of 26.6, and predicted that 20–23 tropical storms, would occur over the Western Pacific during 2010. The Central Weather Bureau also predicted that between two and four tropical storms would affect Taiwan during 2010. After the slow start to the season, on July 5, PAGASA reported that they now only expected 13–15 tropical cyclones to pass through the region.

== Season summary ==
The first tropical cyclone of the season; Tropical Depression 01W formed on January 18, about 300 km to the northeast of Brunei. During the next 2 days the depression moved quickly and made landfall on Vietnam and dissipated over Cambodia during January 20. The depression caused 3 deaths and caused US$243,000 in damage to Vietnam. After 01W had dissipated the Western Pacific became dormant until Tropical Storm Omais formed about 325 km (202 mi) to the southeast of Chuuk Island on March 22. During the next couple of days Omais impacted the Micronesian islands of Woleai, Fais Ulithi and Yap, before moving into the Philippine area of responsibility and being named as Agaton by PAGASA. However, Omais (Agaton) dissipated on March 26 before it could affect the Philippines. After Omais dissipated there were 2 non-developing tropical depressions only monitored by the JMA in April and June before on July 11 the first typhoon of the season: Conson formed. Conson quickly intensified becoming a typhoon the next day, before making landfall on the Philippines during July 13.

Overall, there were 14 named tropical storms during the season, which was the lowest on record; this was 2 less than the previous record set in 1998, and 12.7 less than the average of 26.7 storms. Although activity was below normal throughout the year, the quietest time of the year, with respect to climatology, was from October to December. Only two storms formed during the time period, which was 5.7 less than average. The overall inactivity was due to a variety of meteorological conditions, including decreased vorticity and suppressed convection. During the summer of 2010, convective activity in southeastern Asia was shifted to the northern Indian Ocean due to winds in the upper atmosphere. However, sea surface temperatures were above normal due to an ongoing La Niña, despite that typically being a favorable factor in tropical cyclogenesis.

== Systems ==
=== Tropical Depression 01W ===
- Tropical depression (JMA)
- Tropical depression (SSHWS)
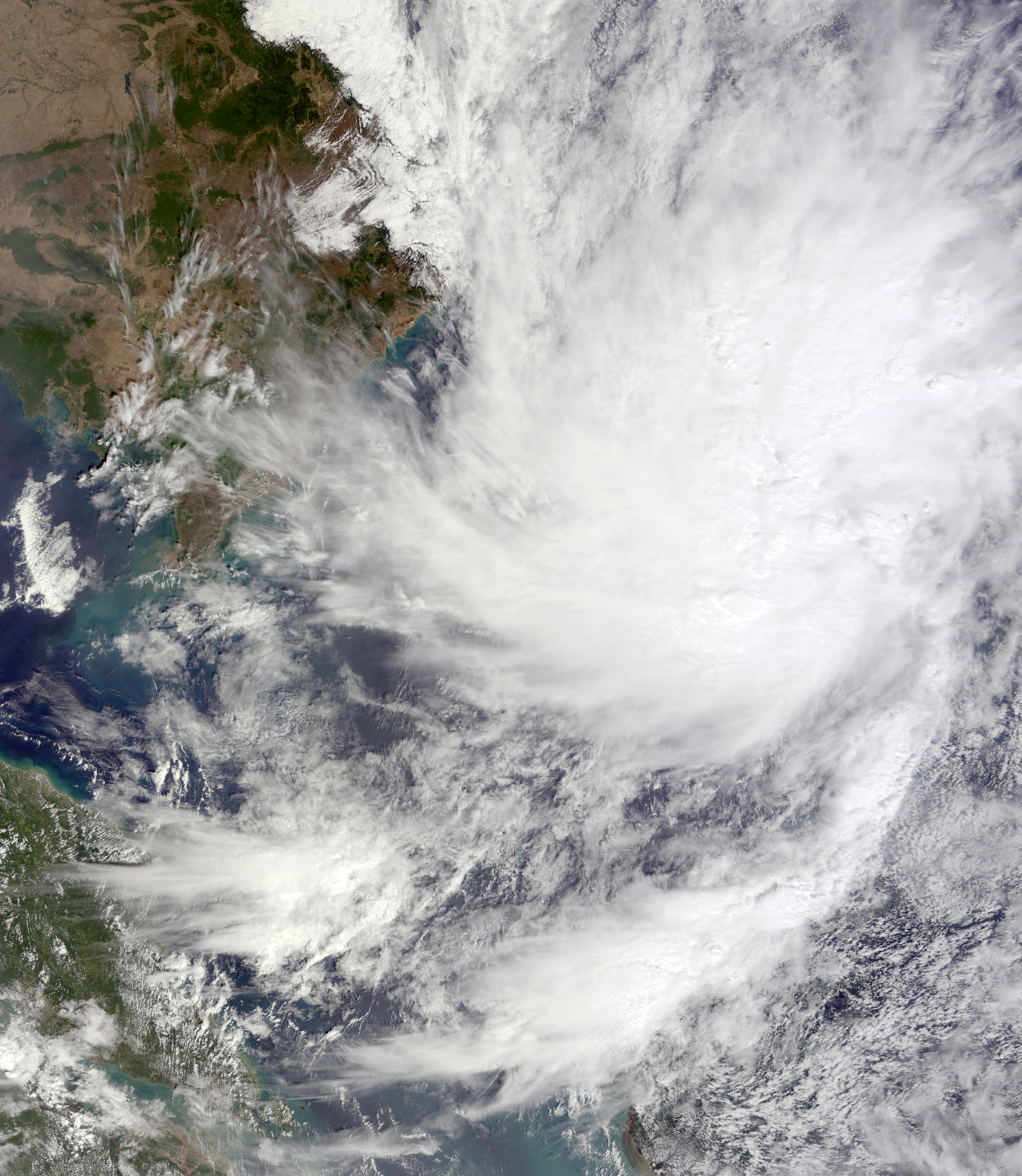
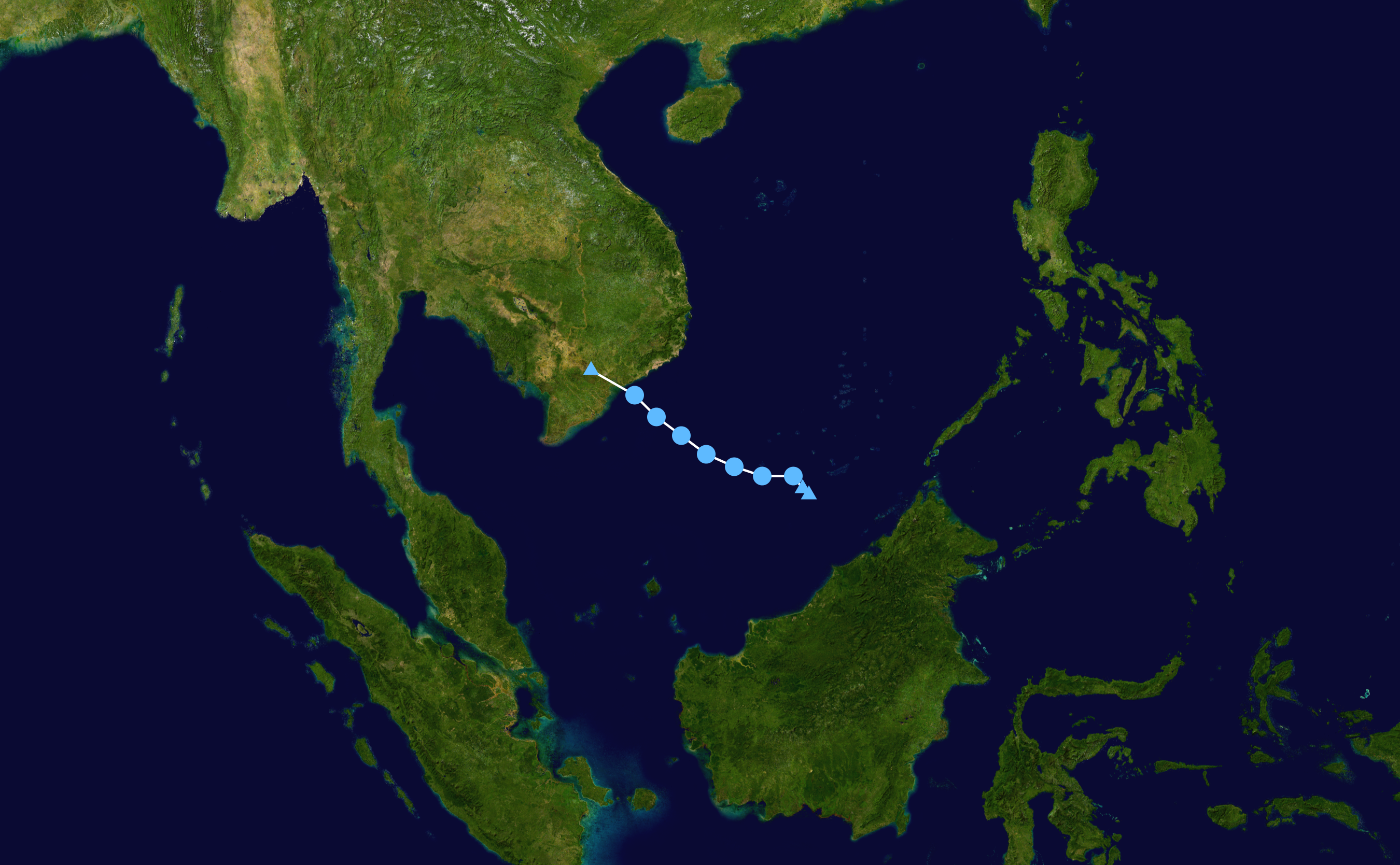
- Duration: January 18 – January 20
- Peak intensity: 55 km/h (35 mph) (10-min); 1006 hPa (mbar)

On January 16, a disorganized area of low pressure formed in the south China Sea. The next day, it gradually intensified into a weak tropical disturbance by the JTWC. Early on January 18 the JMA reported that it was upgraded to a tropical depression which had formed within the northeast monsoon about 320 km (200 mi) to the north-west of Bandar Seri Begawan in Brunei. The depression's low level circulation center was partially exposed and located within an area of moderate to strong vertical wind shear. However over the next 12 hours, whilst the depression moved towards Vietnam, the low level circulation center rapidly consolidated and became well defined after the vertical wind shear around the system relaxed. As a result of this the JTWC initiated advisories on the depression, designating it as Tropical Depression 01W. During the next day, the depression weakened with the low level circulation center becoming partially exposed, as it moved over an area of cold sea surface temperatures. As a result of this the JTWC issued their final advisory on the system later that day. The depression then made landfall on Vietnam near Gò Công early on January 20 before the JMA then issued their final advisory later that day as the system dissipated over Cambodia.

Within Vietnam strong waves caused by the tropical depression, causing three people to die, while rowing their coracles to find shelter.

=== Tropical Storm Omais (Agaton) ===
- Tropical storm (JMA)
- Tropical storm (SSHWS)
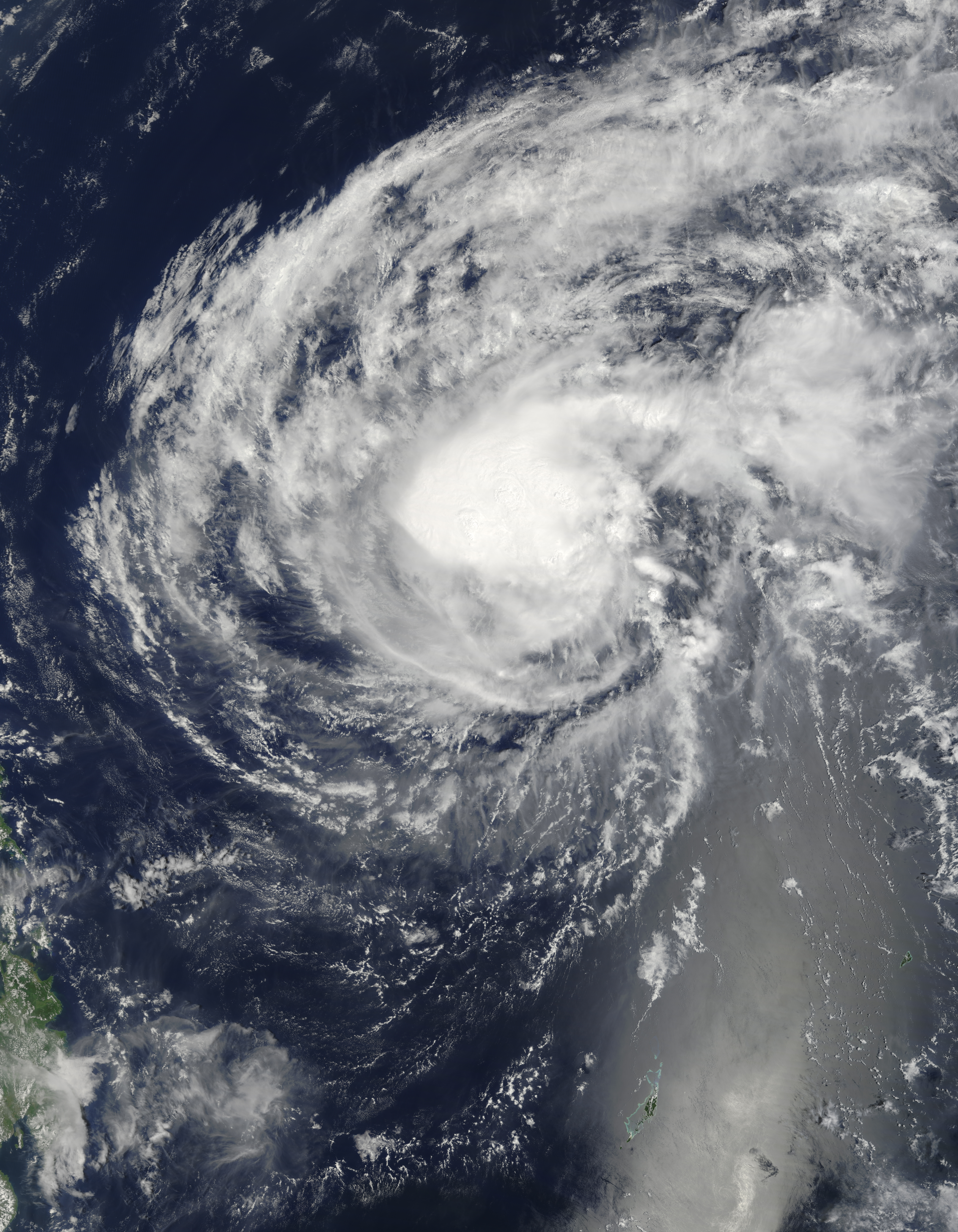
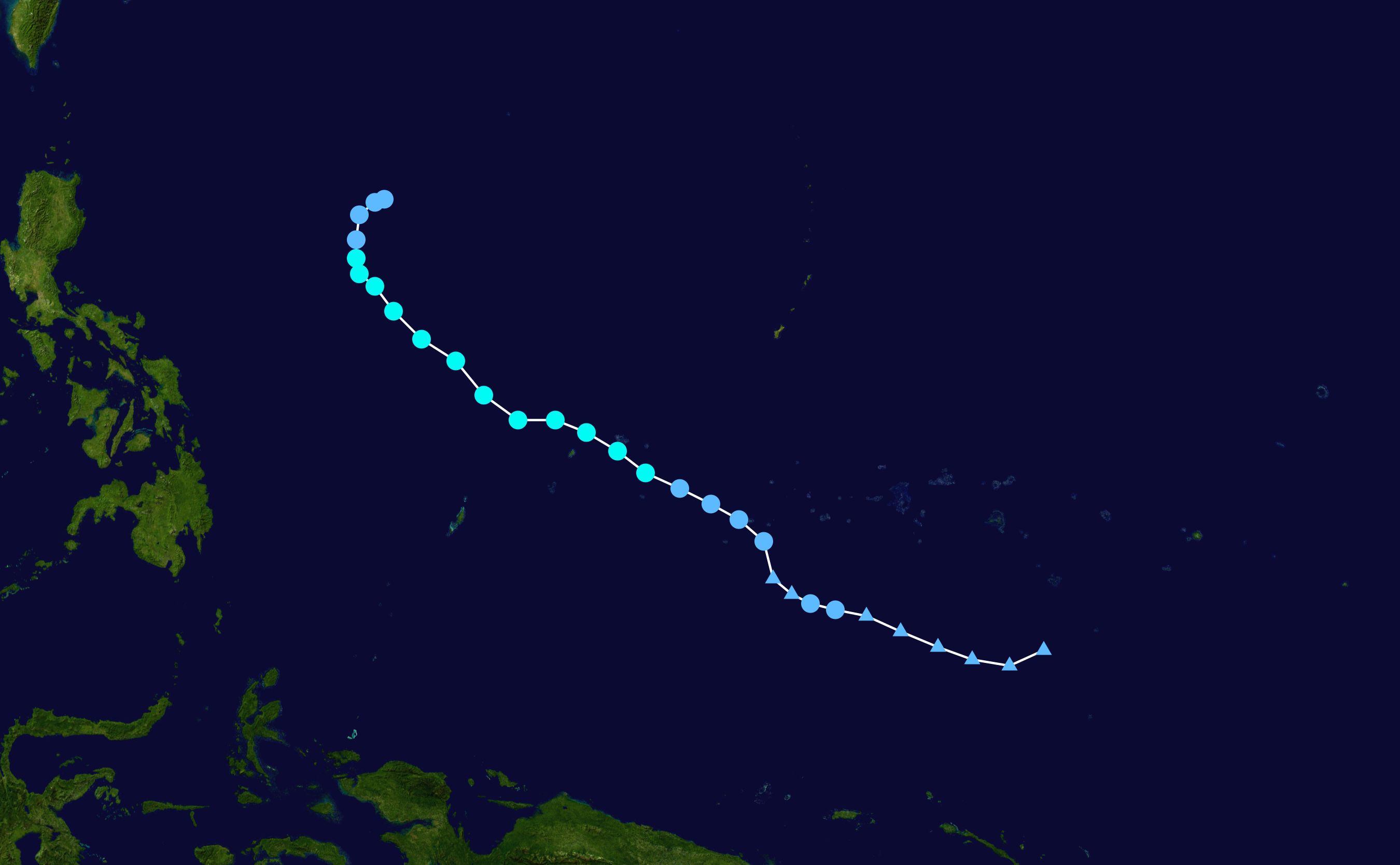
- Duration: March 20 – March 26
- Peak intensity: 65 km/h (40 mph) (10-min); 998 hPa (mbar)

On March 18, the JTWC reported that an area of deep atmospheric convection had persisted about 325 km (202 mi) to the southeast of Chuuk Island in southern Micronesia. At this stage the poorly organised deep convection was located over a low level circulation center and was in an area of low wind shear. Over the next couple of days both the low level circulation center and the deep convection gradually became better organized, prompting the issuance of a Tropical Cyclone Formation Alert late on March 20. During the next day convection continued to build over the low level circulation center, which became well defined whilst moving around the subtropical ridge. The JTWC then initiated advisories on the system later that day, designating it as Tropical Depression 02W, although the JMA did not designate the system as a tropical depression until early on March 22. During March 22 further development of the system was hampered by an anticyclone to the east of the system that caused moderate to strong wind shear. Early of the next day, JTWC upgraded the depression into a tropical storm, and on 24 March JMA upgraded it to Tropical Storm Omais, the first of the season. Late on March 25, the JTWC downgraded Omais to tropical depression strength. Tropical Depression Omais re-gained tropical storm status late on March 26 as it was becoming extratropical.

=== Typhoon Conson (Basyang) ===
- Typhoon (JMA)
- Category 1 typhoon (SSHWS)
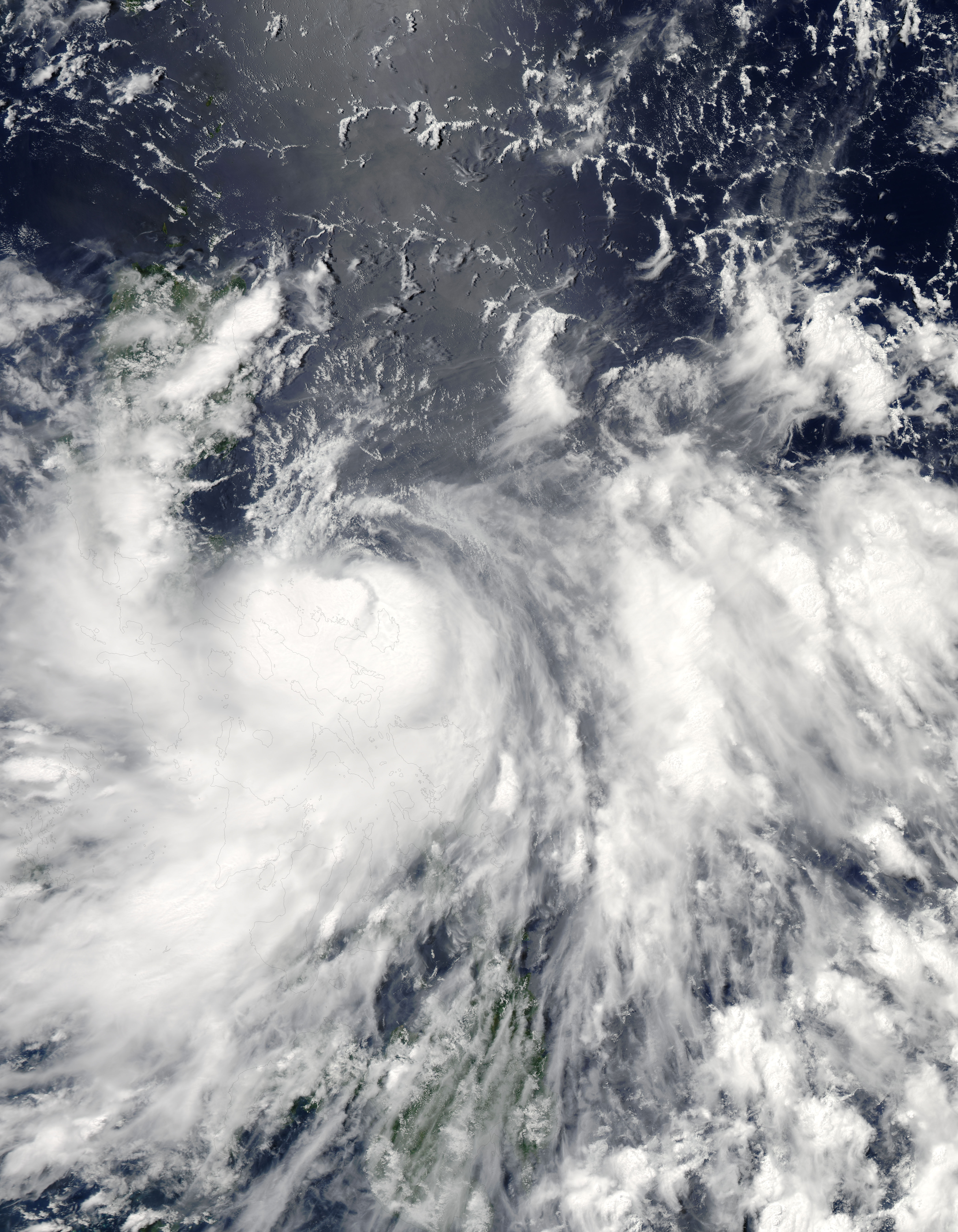
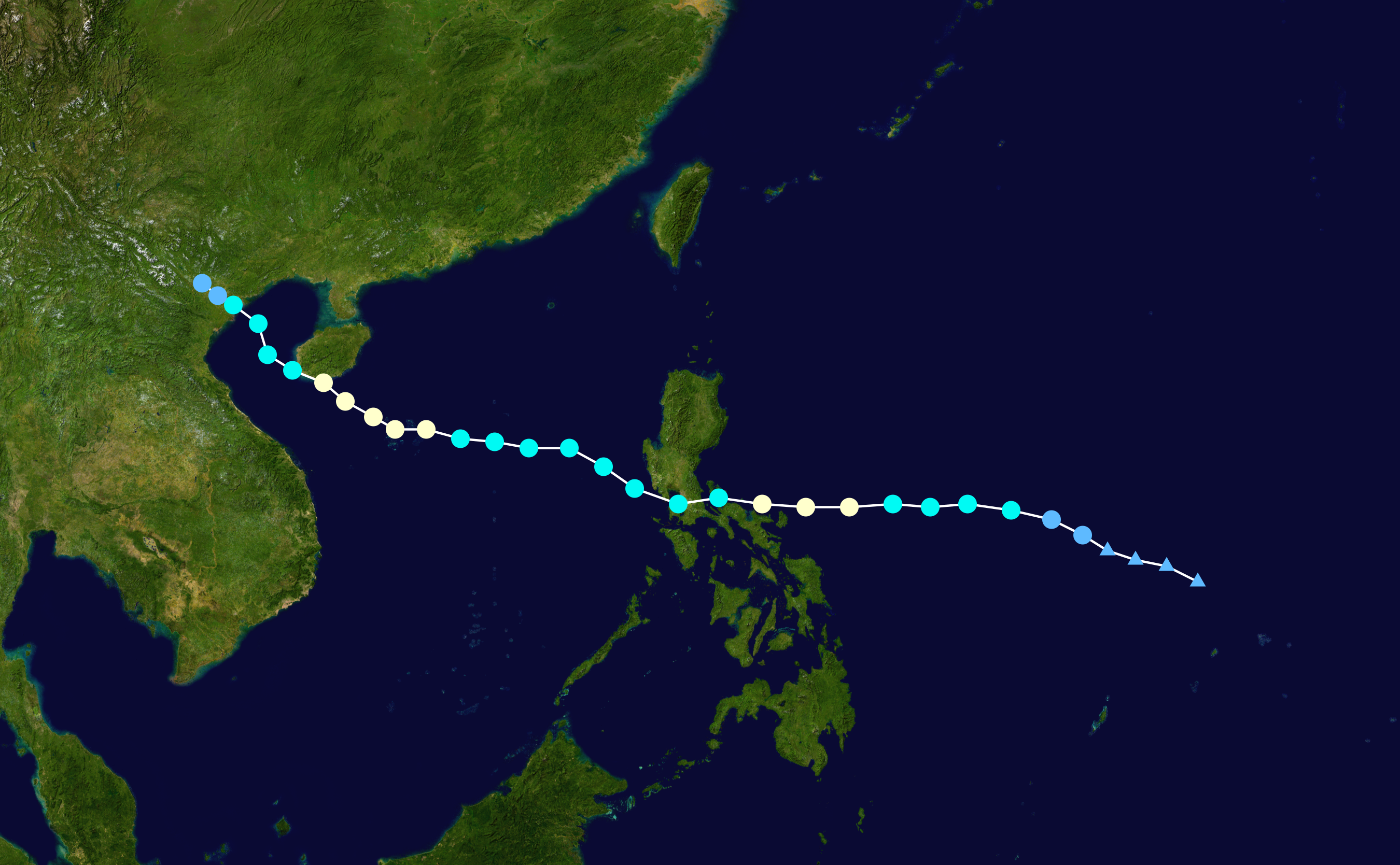
- Duration: July 11 – July 18
- Peak intensity: 120 km/h (75 mph) (10-min); 975 hPa (mbar)

Typhoon Conson, developed into a tropical depression early on July 11 before rapidly developing into the second tropical storm of the season and named as Conson during the next day. During that afternoon Conson, kept intensifying before the JMA reported that Conson had reached its initial ten-minute peak sustained wind speeds of 110 km/h (70 mph), which made it a severe tropical Storm on the JMA's scale. Later that day, the JTWC reported that Conson had intensified into a typhoon before reporting early on July 13 the next day that it had reached its initial one-minute peak sustained wind speeds of 110 km/h (70 mph) which made it a Category 1 typhoon on the Saffir–Simpson hurricane scale. During July 13, Conson started to weaken as it interacted with the Philippines before it made landfall near General Nakar, Quezon. Whilst over the Philippines Conson moved towards the west and passed over Manila before moving into the South China Sea early on July 14. During that day Conson weakened further under the influence of high vertical wind shear before during the next day the vertical wind shear weakened slightly. As a result, Conson intensified over the South China Sea and became a typhoon early on July 16, with the JMA reporting ten-minute peak sustained wind speeds of 130 km/h (80 mph), whilst the JTWC reported peak one minute wind speeds of 150 km/h (95 mph) later that day as it passed closed to Hainan Island. After passing close to Hainan island, Conson moved into an area with high levels of vertical wind shear and as a result it rapidly weakened into a tropical storm, before making landfall in Vietnam during July 17. On July 18 Conson dissipated.

On the morning of July 13, DEPED suspended all elementary and preschool classes in Metro Manila and some other provinces. All flights were canceled due to heavy rains and strong winds brought by Conson. Severe flooding was also reported in Bicol Region. In addition, Conson sank three fishing vessels in the province of Catanduanes, Philippines. JTWC's 6:00 bulletin indicated that Conson would be passing through Metro Manila at about 2 or 3 in the morning the following day, which it did.

By late evening, Conson began its westerly path towards the direction of Metro Manila. Heavy rains and strong winds battered the Metropolis throughout the night. By 11 pm, PAGASA raised storm warning in the Metro to Signal number two. At 12:42 am, Meralco cut off power supplies to Metro Manila and nearby areas amidst various reports that billboards fell through power lines around the area; as much as 12 million people in Metro Manila alone still have their power services restored by the afternoon. At least twenty-six people were killed, and 38 were left missing in the Philippines as a result of the storm. The province of Laguna was placed under a state of calamity as a result of the storm. An estimated P47 million worth of agricultural products were damaged in the province. On July 16, the National Disaster Coordinating Council has revised the death toll to 38. The power outage also rendered the PAGASA website offline.

=== Typhoon Chanthu (Caloy) ===
- Typhoon (JMA)
- Category 1 typhoon (SSHWS)
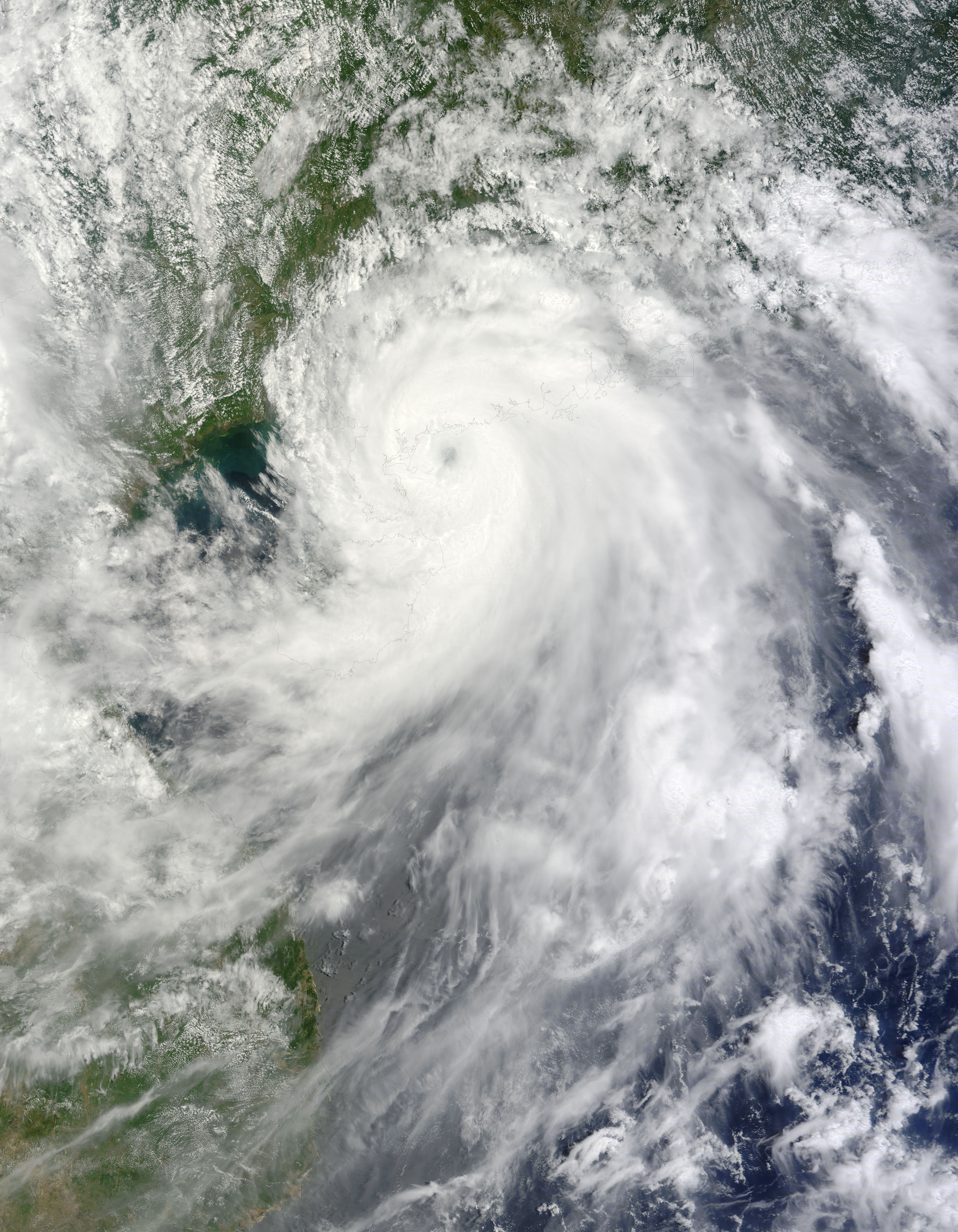
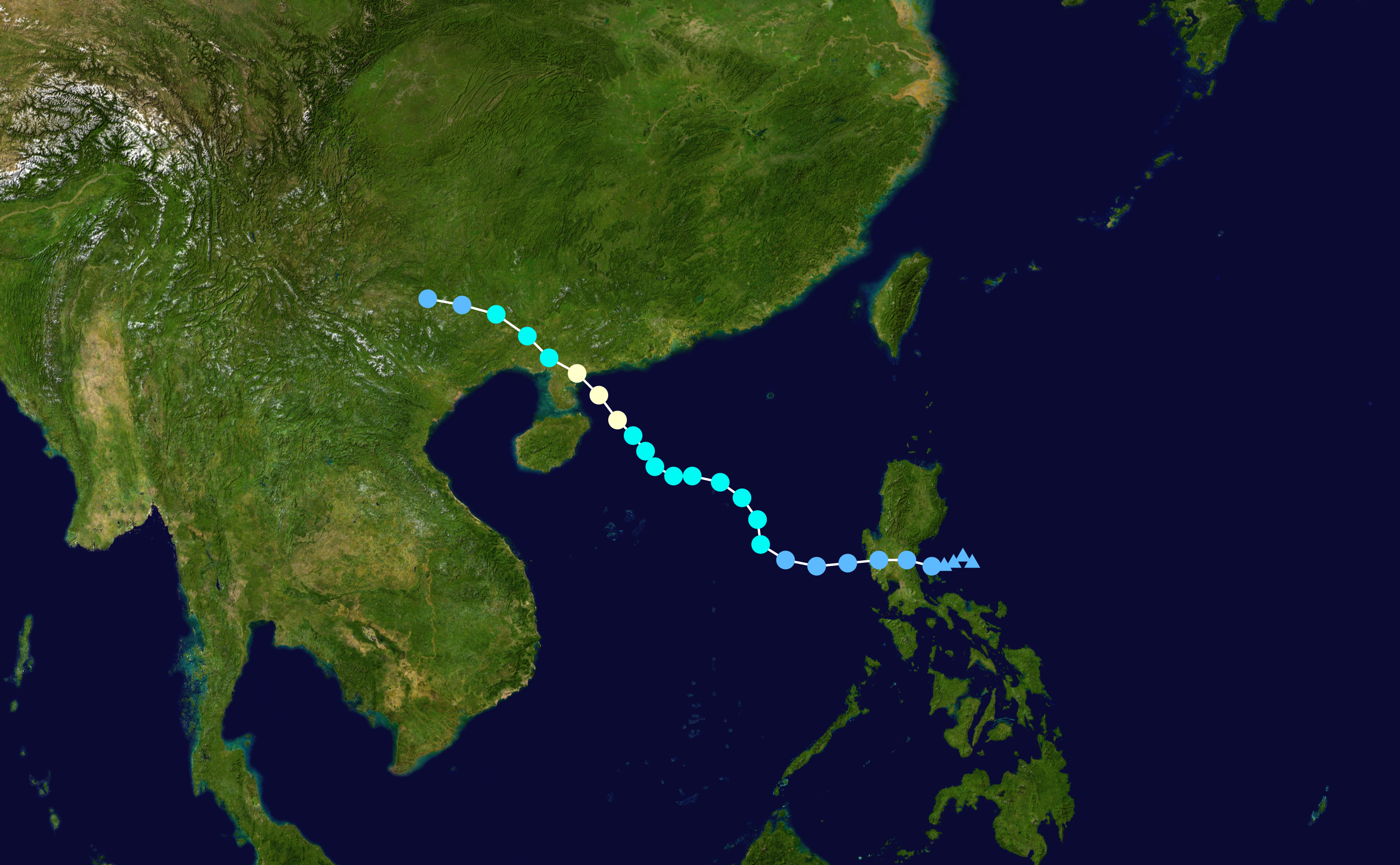
- Duration: July 17 – July 23
- Peak intensity: 130 km/h (80 mph) (10-min); 970 hPa (mbar)

Early on July 17, the JMA reported that a tropical depression had developed about 220 km (140 mi) to the northeast of Manila, Philippines. Later that day the JTWC reported that the depression had a small low level circulation center with deep convection flaring to the northeast of the center. However, as the low level circulation center was located close to land and was not very organized, the JTWC declared that there was a poor chance of it becoming a significant tropical cyclone within 48 hours. However, during that day, the depression rapidly consolidated with an anticyclone helping to develop the low level circulation center. As a result, early the next day the JTWC issued a Tropical Cyclone Formation Alert on the depression, however they thought that further development might be hindered as it was located close to land. Whilst it moved along the southern edge of the subtropical ridge, the Depression made landfall on Aurora province at 0600 UTC, before the JTWC initiated advisories later that morning, as the low level circulation center had consolidated and poleward outflow into the tropical upper tropospheric trough had improved. Late on July 19, PAGASA issued their last advisory on Tropical Storm Caloy as it had moved out of their Area of Responsibility. Following the system's development, PAGASA stated that rainfall from system could trigger landslides and flooding in Aurora, the Bicol Region, and Quezon. Throughout Aurora, heavy rains triggered flash flooding which destroyed at least one home and stranded hundreds of residents. The Paltic barangay, within Dingalan, became inaccessible to rescuers after the local river topped its banks and washed out nearby slopes.

In Luzon, heavy rains triggered floods that destroyed at least one house and stranded thousands of people. Eight people were killed in the Philippines. When Chanthu's rain bands passed over Hong Kong, heavy rains brought about serious floodings across the territory. The Black Rainstorm Signal was issued. Two people were drowned and found dead, and two are still missing. In all, 9 people were killed in South China, and total economic losses were counted to be CNY 5.54 billion (US$817.7 million).

=== Tropical Storm Domeng ===
- Tropical storm (PAGASA)
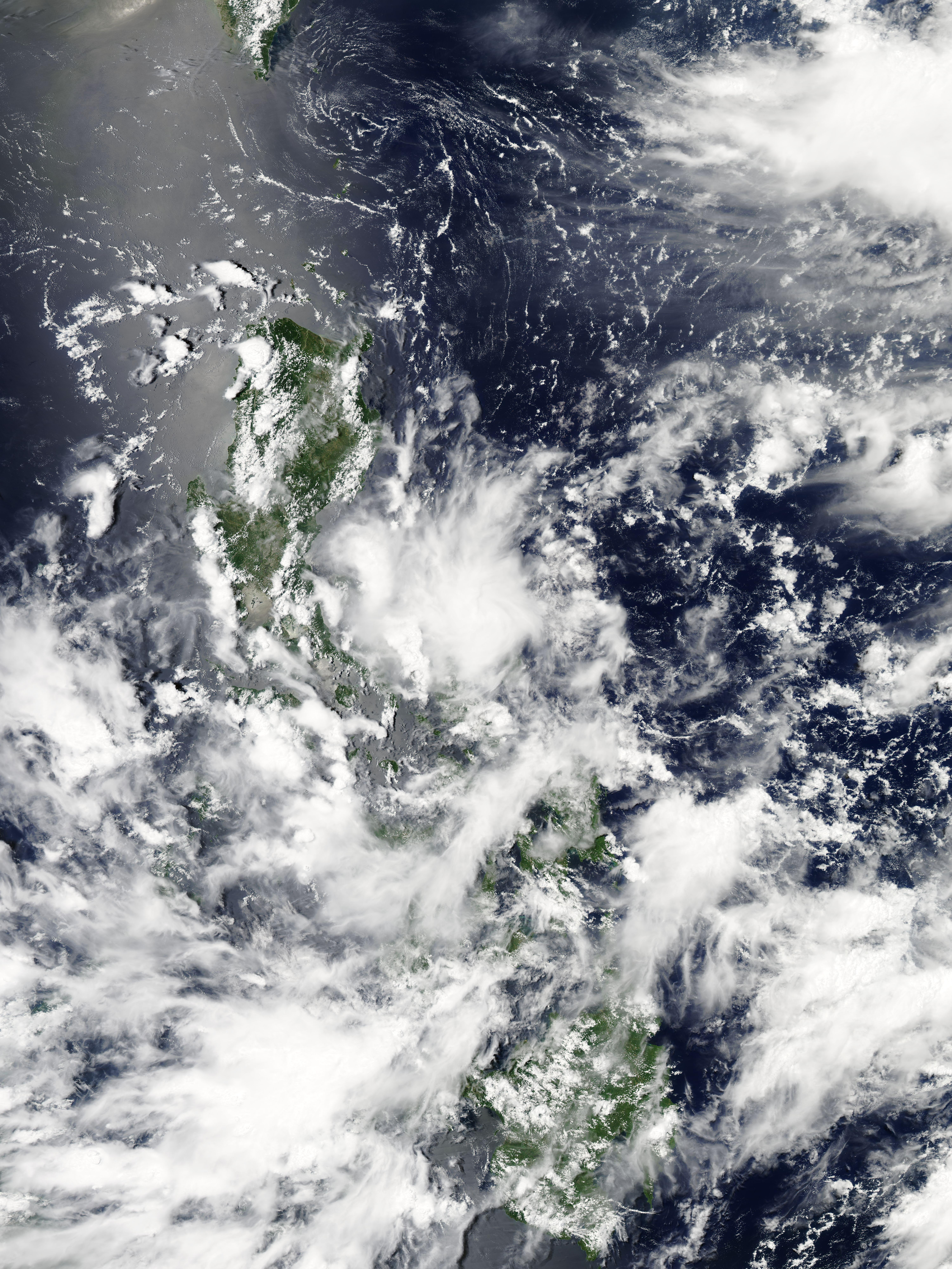
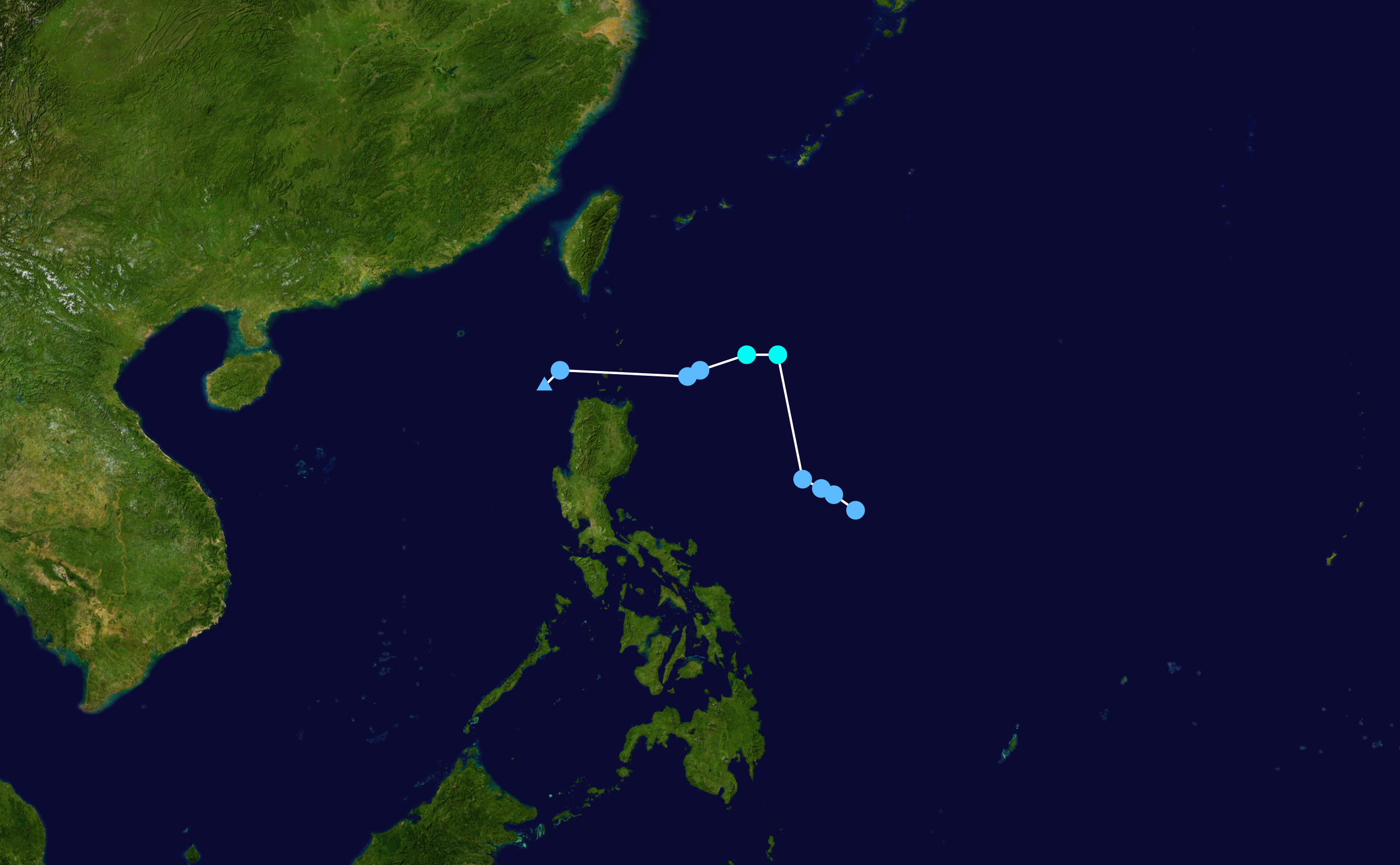
- Duration: August 3 – August 5
- Peak intensity: 65 km/h (40 mph) (10-min); 997 hPa (mbar)

Late on August 2, PAGASA reported that a low-pressure area had formed within the Intertropical Convergence Zone about 570 km to the northeast of Virac, Catanduanes. Early the next day PAGASA reported that the low-pressure area had intensified into a tropical depression and named it as Domeng. During that day Domeng interacted with another low-pressure area which was located to the north of the system, before merging with it early on August 4. After Domeng had merged with the low-pressure area, PAGASA reported that Domeng had intensified into a tropical storm and reached its 10-minute peak sustained windspeeds of 65 km/h (40 mph). Later that day PAGASA reported that Domeng had weakened into a tropical depression, before reporting early the next day that after it had passed through the Babuyan Islands, Domeng had weakened into an area of low pressure.

In Luzon, heavy rain produced by the storm led to a few landslides, prompting road closures. Offshore, three people drowned after their boat capsized amidst rough seas produced by Domeng.

=== Severe Tropical Storm Dianmu (Ester) ===
- Severe tropical storm (JMA)
- Tropical storm (SSHWS)
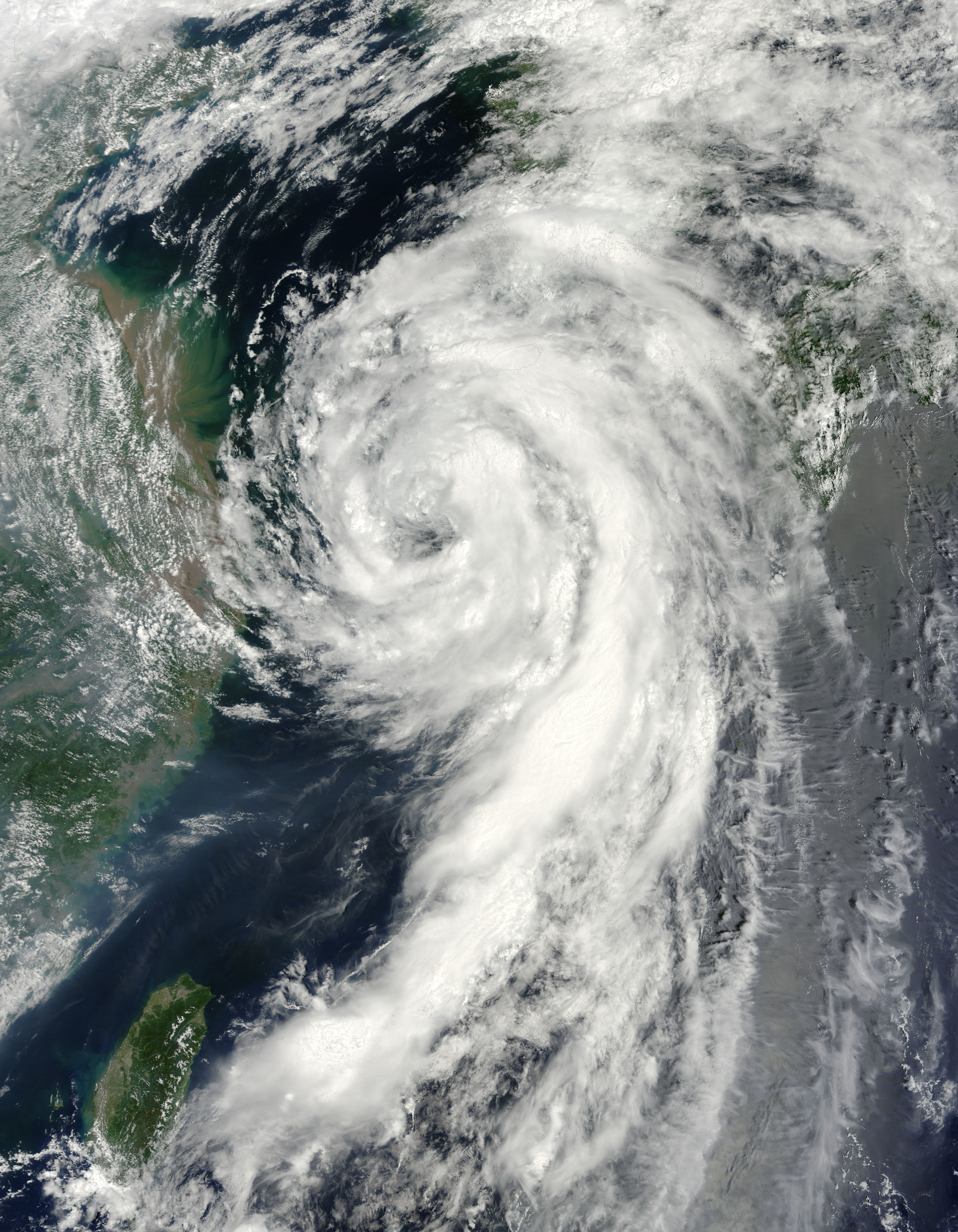
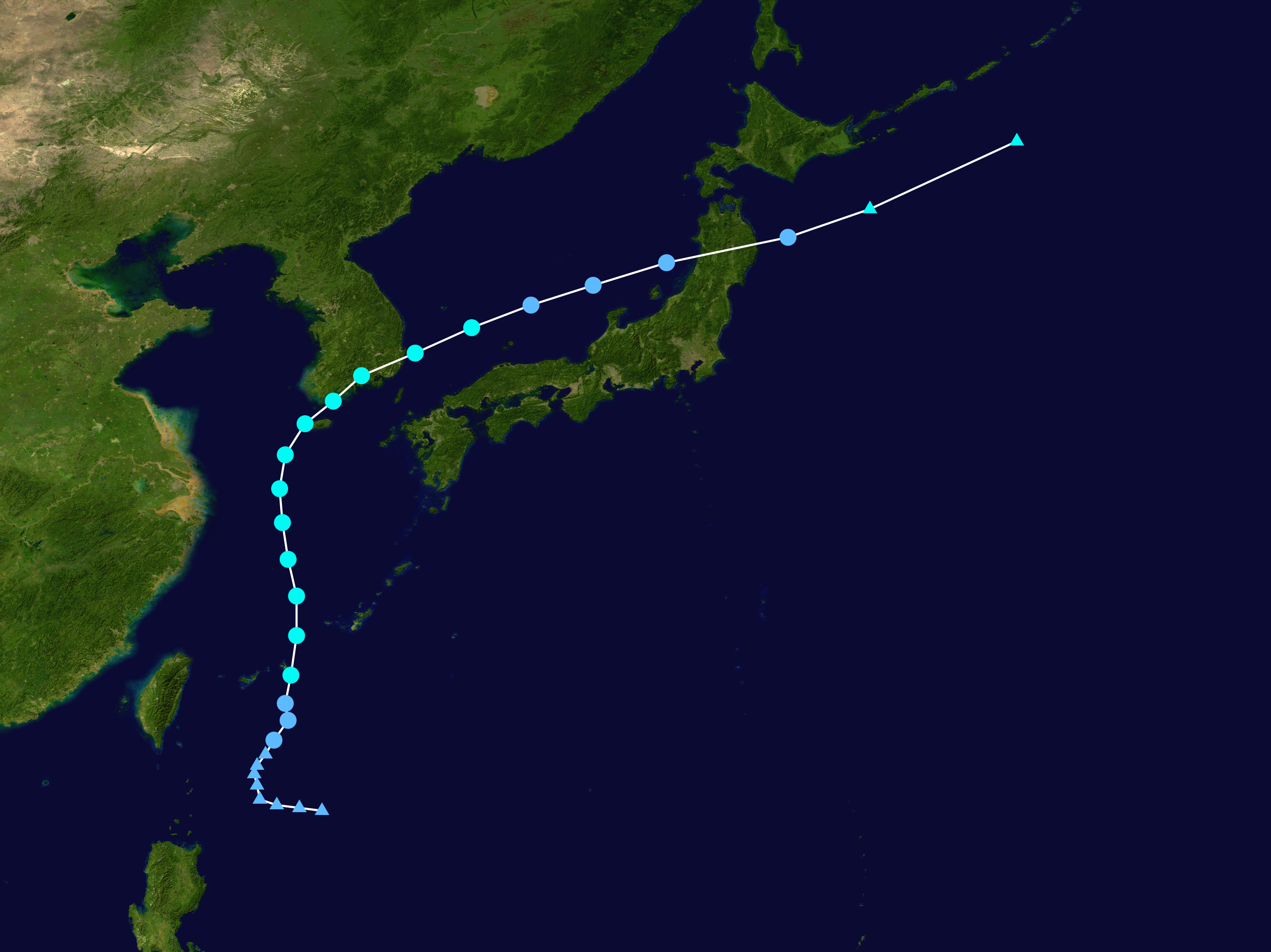
- Duration: August 6 – August 12
- Peak intensity: 95 km/h (60 mph) (10-min); 985 hPa (mbar)

Early on August 6, the JTWC reported that a tropical disturbance formed within the monsoon gyre about 800 km (500 mi) southeast of Taipei, Taiwan. Later that day PAGASA reported that the disturbance had developed into a tropical depression and named it as Ester, before the JTWC issued a Tropical Cyclone Formation Alert early the next day. During that day the JMA started to monitor the depression before the JTWC designated it as Tropical Depression 05W. The depression was then upgraded into a tropical storm by the JMA and named "Dianmu", the mother of lightning in Chinese folklore, with the JTWC following suit soon after. Early the next day, the JMA further upgraded the tropical storm into a severe tropical storm. After moving northward for several days, it turned northeastward and struck southern South Korea. Dianmu weakened as it crossed the Korean peninsula and emerged into the Sea of Japan.

Heavy rains produced by the storm killed one people on a cargo ship sank amidst rough seas produced by the storm. In South Korea, at least 5 people were killed by Dianmu in flood-related incidents. This marked the first time in nine years that a rain-related fatality took place in the capital city of Seoul. More than 3,000 homes were destroyed in eastern China after heavy rains from the outer bands of Dianmu struck the region. The storm made landfall on Japan; exiting the country within five hours. Heavy rains were reported throughout the islands.

Nearly a week after the two ships sank off the coast of the Philippines, 31 crew members were confirmed dead after numerous coast guard rescue attempts. Damage from the storm on Jeju Island amounted to 5 billion won (US$4.2 million).

=== Tropical Storm Mindulle ===
- Tropical storm (JMA)
- Category 1 typhoon (SSHWS)
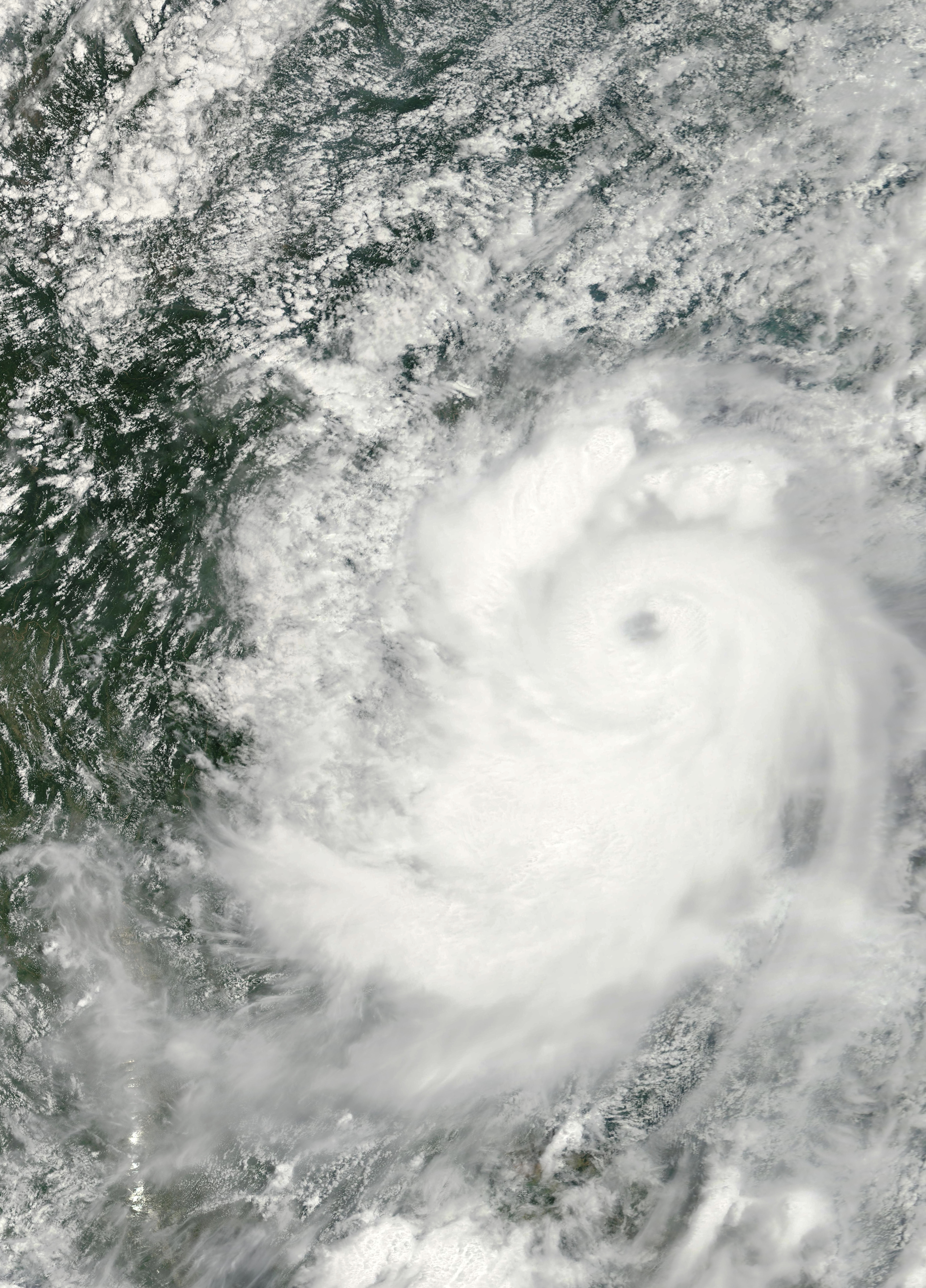
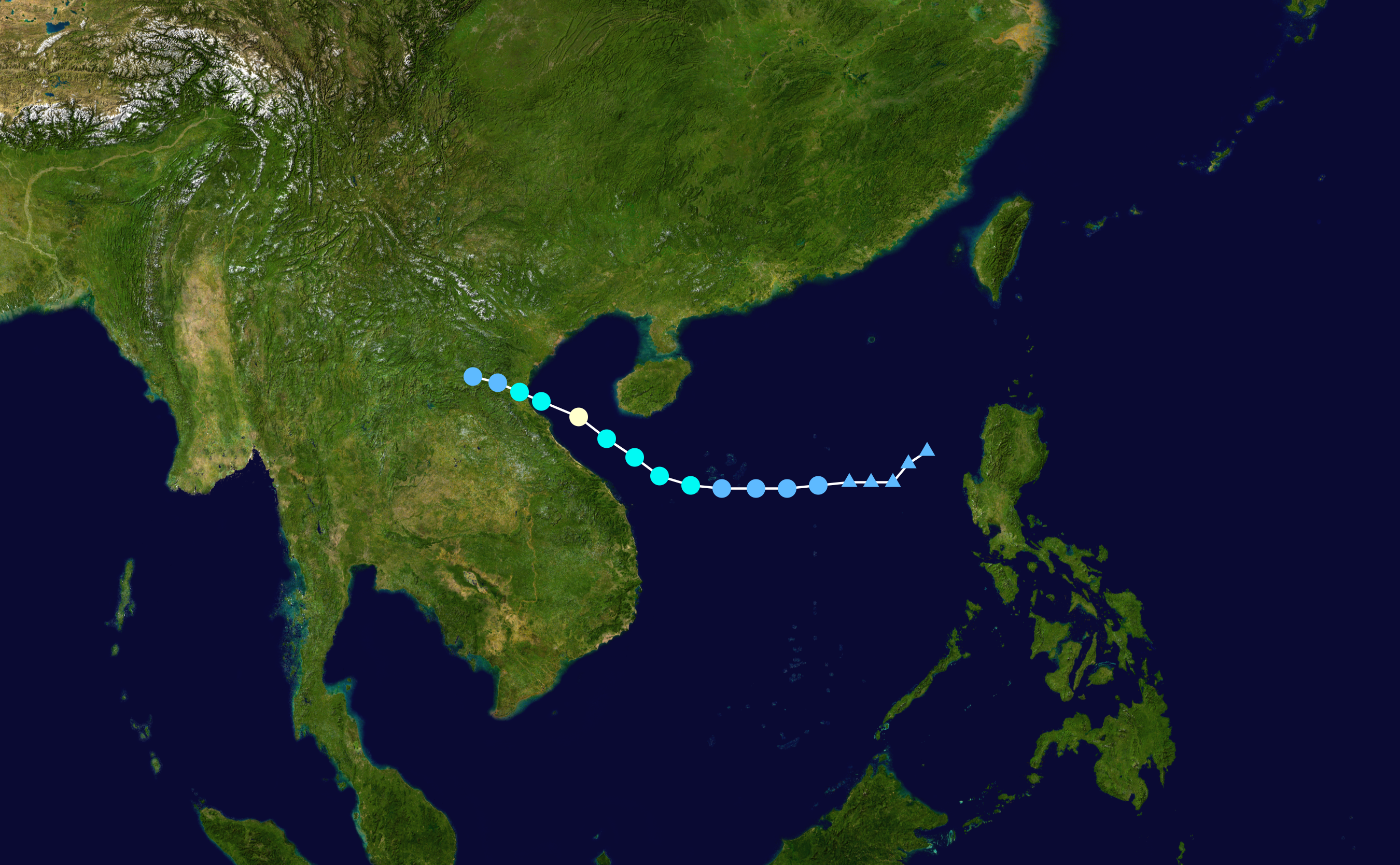
- Duration: August 21 – August 26
- Peak intensity: 85 km/h (50 mph) (10-min); 985 hPa (mbar)

Early on August 17, an area of low pressure formed about 415 km (258 mi), northeast of Tuguegarao City. The next day the disturbance started to move west. However, on the evening of August 18, as it crossed Babuyan Islands, the disturbance's low level center (LLC) weakened due to land interaction and high vertical wind shear. It regenerated on August 20 when it was located about 280 km (170 mi), to the west of Dagupan. Early on the next day, the disturbance started to move west and located in warm water temperatures and favorable conditions with moderate vertical wind shear. At the same time, the LCC of the disturbance became partially exposed due to a tropical upper tropospheric trough (TUTT) that was developing off Luzon at that time. On the afternoon of that day, Japan Meteorological Agency (JMA) upgraded the system into a tropical depression. The next day, they further upgraded the depression into a tropical storm and named it "Mindulle". At the same time, the JTWC reported that Tropical Depression 06W has intensified into a tropical storm. It became a typhoon and hit Vietnam. Due to land interaction, Mindulle rapidly weakened on August 25 and fully dissipated and made their final warning very early on August 26.

On Hòn Ngư Island [vi], near the coast of Vietnam, a weather station reported sustained winds of 101 km/h (63 mph), with gusts reaching 180 km/h (112 mph), and the lowest observed barometric pressure within the storm reaching 978.9 hPa (28.91 inHg). On the mainland of Vietnam, in Quỳnh Lưu (Nghệ An ), wind gusts of 119 km/h (74 mph) were recorded. The total rainfall along the Hà Tĩnh-Nghệ An coast from 19:00 on August 22 to 19:00 on August 25 (UTC+7) was generally over 150mm, with some locations recording values exceeding 300mm.

As the storm neared Vietnam, thousands of fishermen were urged to return to port. According to Vietnamese officials, contact was lost with 10 vessels on August 24 and the 137 fishermen on the ships were listed as missing. Across the country, at least 10 people were killed and losses reached ₫850 billion (US$43.3 million).

=== Severe Tropical Storm Lionrock (Florita) ===
- Severe tropical storm (JMA)
- Tropical storm (SSHWS)
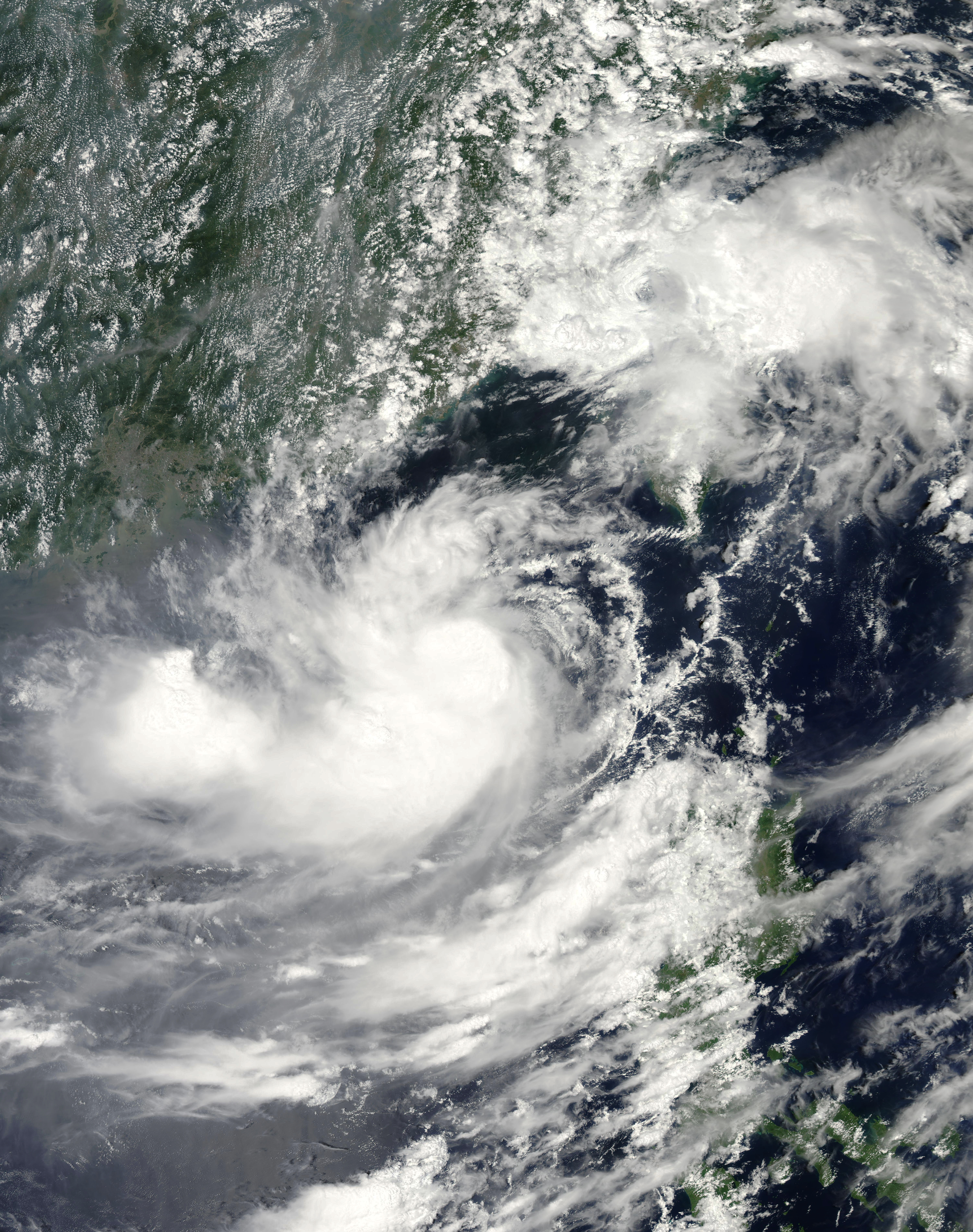
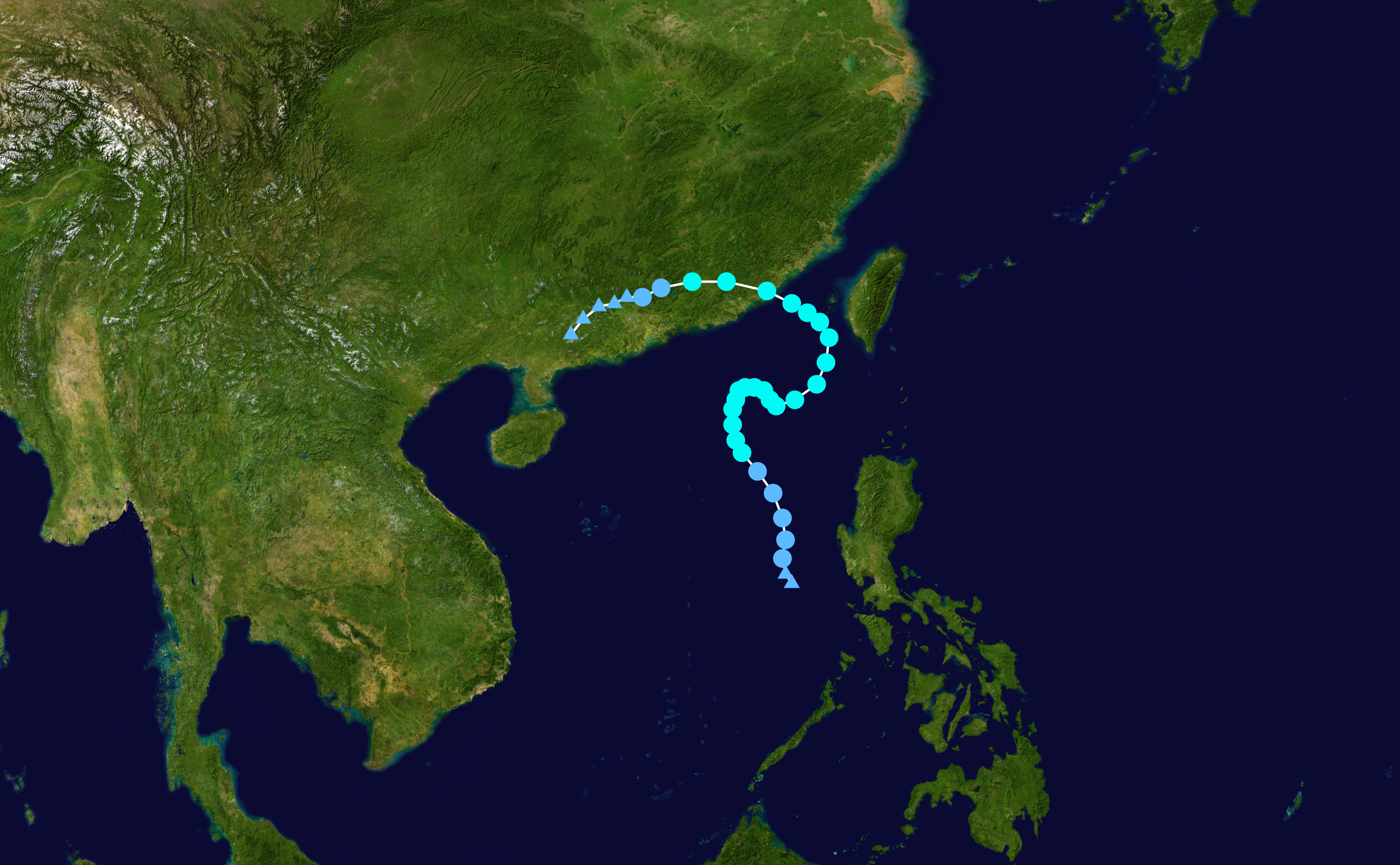
- Duration: August 26 – September 3
- Peak intensity: 95 km/h (60 mph) (10-min); 985 hPa (mbar)

Early on August 25, an area of low pressure formed about 415 km (258 mi) east of Cagayan, Philippines. The low pressure was located in an area of low vertical wind shear and a favorable environment. At the same time, a tropical upper tropospheric trough (TUTT) was located in the east of the system. The storm also had convection, with good outflow and upper-level divergence. On the next day, the disturbance started to move west and later crossed the island of Luzon but on the next day, the circulation became slightly disorganized due to dry air. Later that afternoon, the Japan Meteorological Agency (JMA) upgraded the disturbance to a tropical depression and the Joint Typhoon Warning Centre (JTWC) issued a Tropical Cyclone Formation Alert (TCFA) which was later upgraded to a tropical depression. The storm was also named Florita by PAGASA. On August 28, the JMA upgraded the system to a tropical storm, and it was named "Lionrock", with winds up to 83 kilometres per hour (52 mph). For the next couple of days, Lionrock remained almost stationary in South China Sea. On August 31, Lionrock start to move northeast slowly due to interaction with tropical storm Namtheun. Early on September 1, Lionrock made a Fujiwhara effect with Namtheun, while Lionrock maintained its strength while Namtheun was absorbed. Since the storm formed with Tropical Storm Namtheun and Typhoon Kompasu, Lionrock exhibited unusual movements along with Namtheun and Kompasu. Analysis showed that the reason for the unusual movements were interaction between all three of the storms, including a Fujiwhara effect absorbing Namtheun. Lionrock made landfall on the east coast of Guangdong Province, China, just north of the city of Shantou. It then started to dissipate and weaken into a tropical storm and moved over Guangzhou, Guangdong's capital. Lionrock soon lost its intensity as it went over Guangdong, and on September 3, the storm had turned into a low-pressure area.

In Hong Kong, signal No 1. was issued on August 29 when the storm was 340 kilometres (210 mi) southeast of Hong Kong. The signal was issued again on September 2, when the storm was close to China and Hong Kong. All signals were later removed after the storm was dissipated on September 3. Rainfall totals observed in the Hong Kong Observatory totaled 63.5 millimetres (2.50 in). A more intense amount of rain was recorded in the Hong Kong International Airport with a total of 139.5 millimetres (5.49 in). Before the storm hit China, the Guangdong Provincial Meteorological Bureau started a level three emergency response plan, while the Fujian counterpart hoisted level four. The storm brought rains and heavy winds onto Zhangzhou. The storm also made landfall in Guangdong, bringing heavy amounts of rain over the area. After the storm hit Guangdong, floods and rainstorms destroyed 165 houses. A total of 160,000 people were brought to evacuation centers. Total economic losses in China were counted to be CNY 441 million (US$65.1 million).

=== Typhoon Kompasu (Glenda) ===
- Typhoon (JMA)
- Category 3 typhoon (SSHWS)
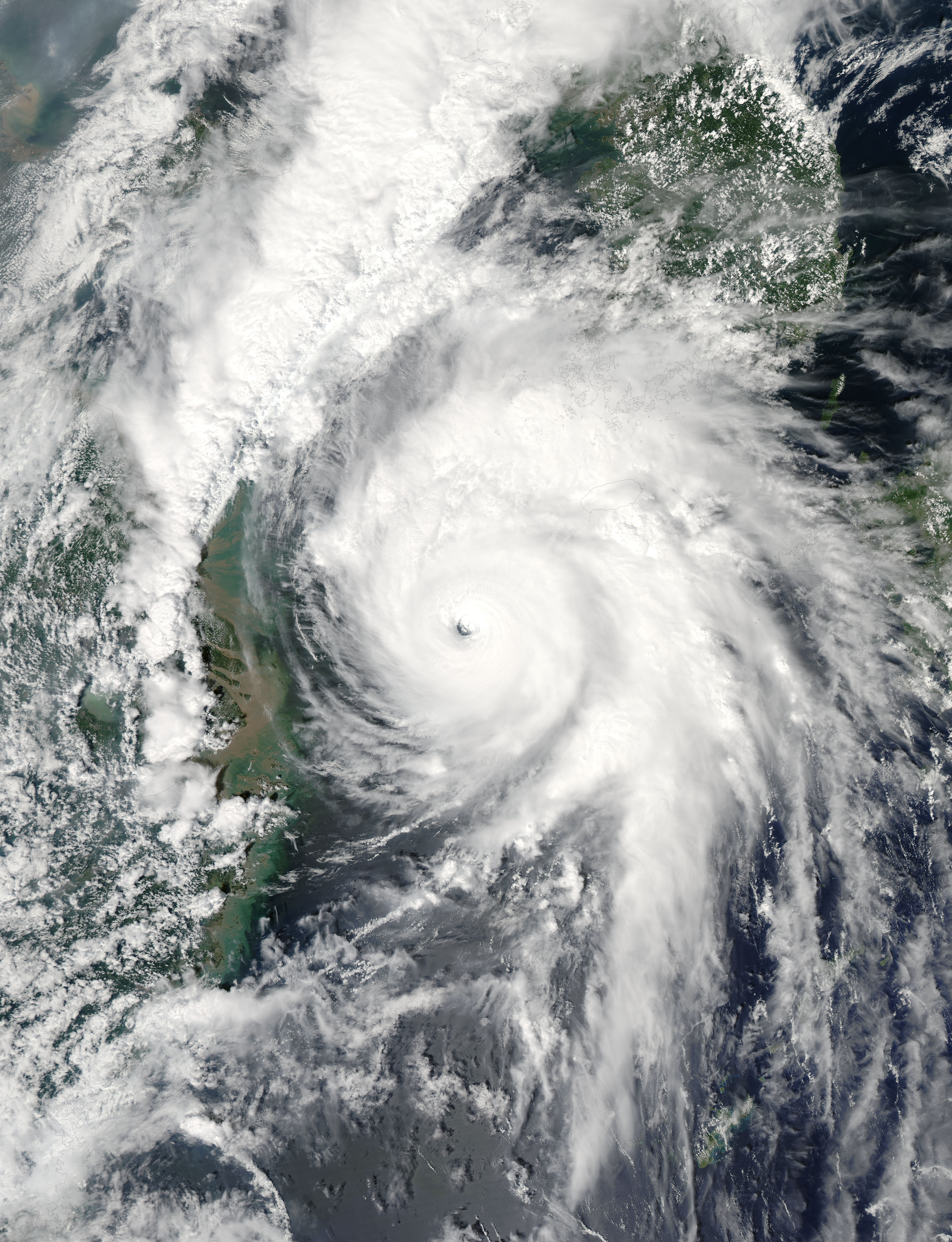
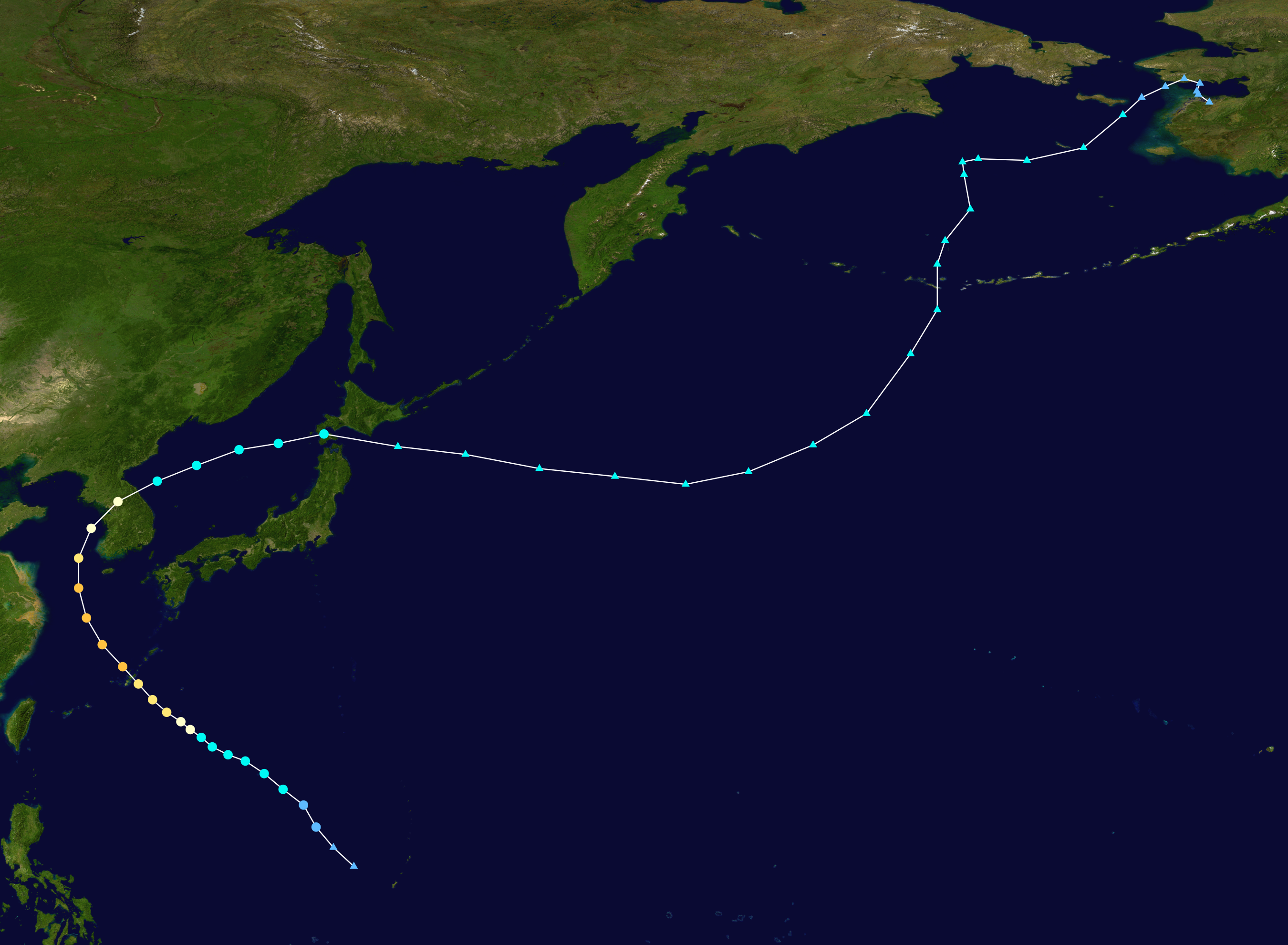
- Duration: August 28 – September 2
- Peak intensity: 150 km/h (90 mph) (10-min); 960 hPa (mbar)

On early August 27, an area of low pressure formed about 305 km (190 mi) to the east of Yap Island. At that time, the system was disorganized due to high vertical wind shear. On the next day, the system started to move northwest and crossed Guam island. On the evening of that day, the system was located about 370 km (230 mi) northwest of Guam. At that time, the system experienced low vertical windshear and was located in a favorable environment. A tropical upper tropospheric trough (TUTT) was located to the east of the system. At that time, the Japan Meteorological Agency (JMA) upgraded the system into a tropical depression. Midday of August 29, the Joint Typhoon Warning Centre (JTWC) issued a Tropical Cyclone Formation Alert (TCFA) on the system as the Low Level Circulation Centre had become organized. On the morning of that same day, the JTWC announced that the system had quickly developed into a tropical storm and assigned the designation "08W". Intensification continued, then by midday of August 30, the JMA reported that the depression had intensified into a tropical storm and assigned it the international designation "Kompasu". In addition, PAGASA also announced that the low pressure in the northeast of Batanes had formed and assigned it a local name, "Glenda". After six hours, the JMA reported that Kompasu had intensified rapidly into a severe tropical storm. At the same time, the JTWC also upgraded Kompasu into a Category 1 typhoon. On the next day, Kompasu crossed the island of Okinawa and rapidly intensified into a Category 2 typhoon equivalent. On September 1, Kompasu was upgraded by JTWC as a Category 3 typhoon equivalent, becoming the 3rd strongest typhoon of the season at the time.

The storm later weakened to a Category 1 typhoon in the Yellow Sea, before veering northeast and making landfall on Ganghwa Island, northwest of Incheon and Seoul, killing at least four people. Kompasu was the strongest tropical storm to hit the Seoul metropolitan area in 15 years. Kompasu weakened to a tropical storm over the Sea of Japan on September 2. In its entire life, it killed a total of 29 people.

=== Tropical Storm Namtheun ===
- Tropical storm (JMA)
- Tropical storm (SSHWS)
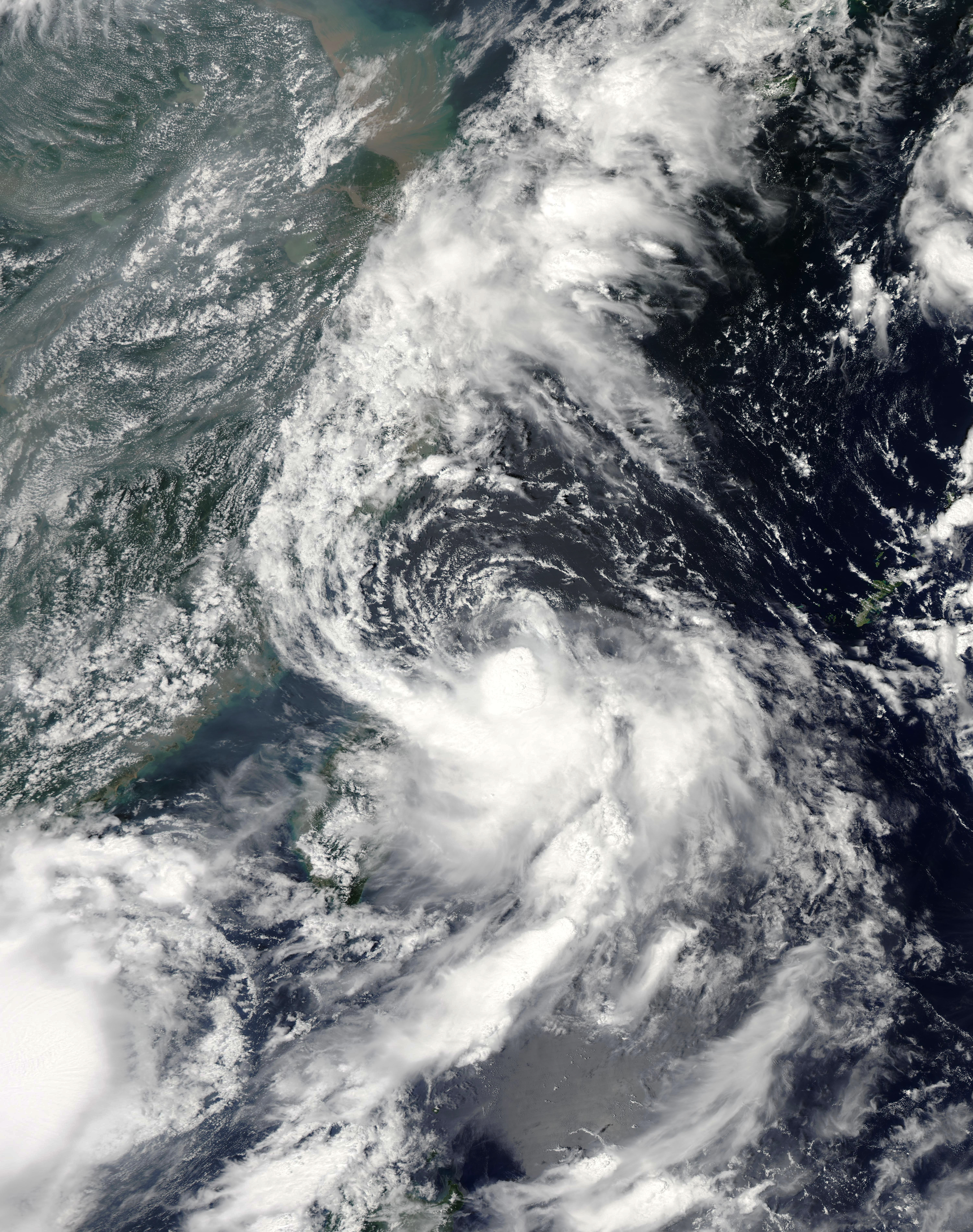
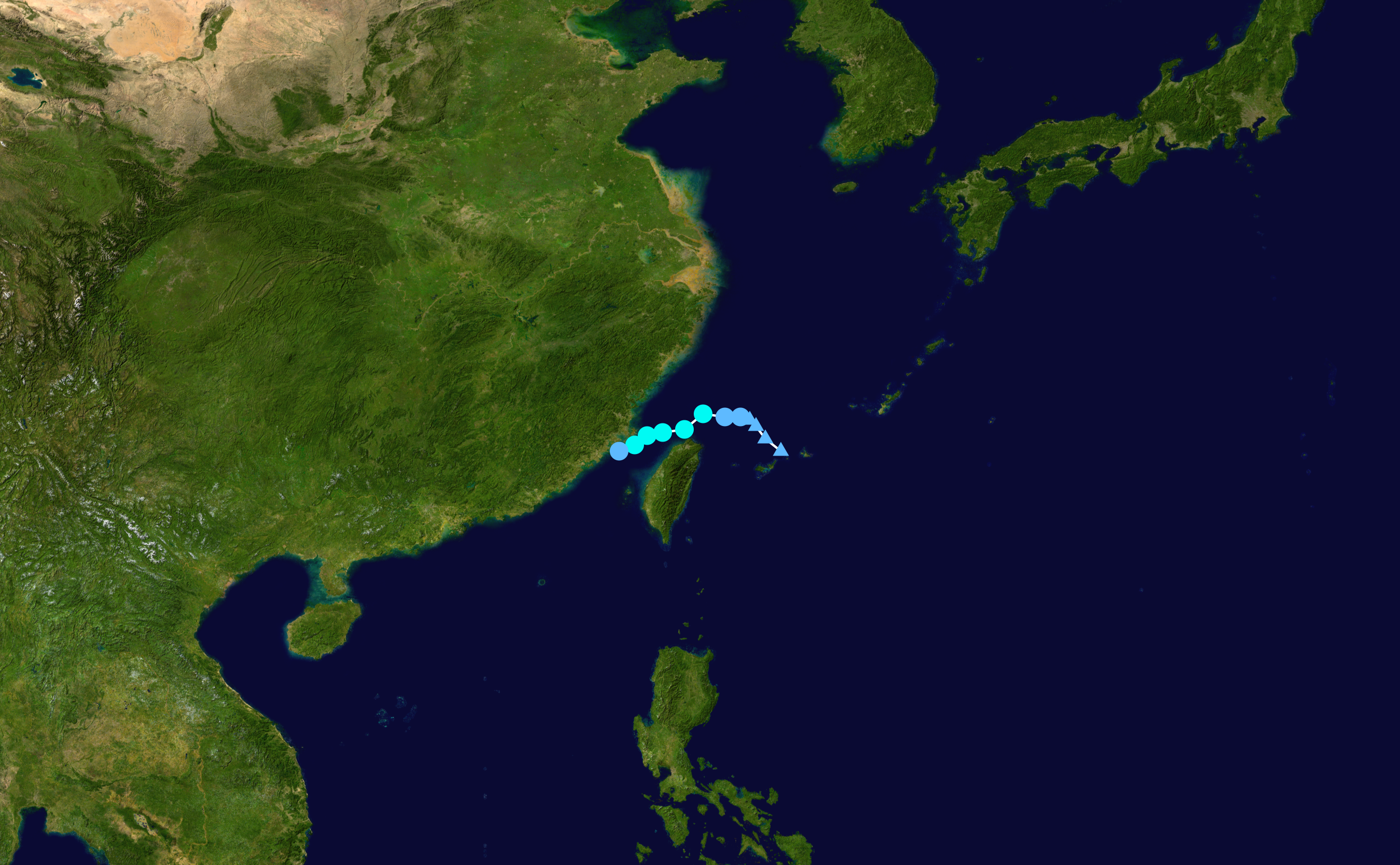
- Duration: August 28 – September 1
- Peak intensity: 65 km/h (40 mph) (10-min); 996 hPa (mbar)

On August 27, an extensive cloud formed in the waters east of Taiwan. On August 28, it developed into a low pressure. At 18:00, near Yaeyama Islands, the Japan Meteorological Agency upgraded the low pressure into a tropical depression. There were two tropical cyclones developing on both sides of 09W (namely Lionrock and Kompasu), and Typhoon Kompasu had a relatively stronger intensity, causing 09W moved southwest to Taiwan Strait. This tropical depression lingered in the east of Taiwan for over a day. On August 30, it caused heavy rain in northern Taiwan. Taiwan's Central Weather Bureau could only issue a tropical depression warning since it had not strengthened to a tropical storm. At 20:00, 09W suddenly intensified into a tropical storm, and was named Namtheun. However, due to the development of another stronger tropical storm Lionrock at South China Sea, the increase of intensity of Namtheun was difficult. In the evening of August 31, Namtheun weakened into a tropical depression north of Taiwan Strait, then continued to move south to southwest, and skirted the southern coast of Fujian province. It continued to weaken, and finally transformed into a low pressure along the coast of Huian, Guangdong. Early of September 1, Lionrock made a Fujiwhara effect with Namtheun, whilst Lionrock maintained its strength while Namtheun was absorbed by Lionrock and fully dissipated early on 1 September.

=== Severe Tropical Storm Malou (Henry) ===
- Severe tropical storm (JMA)
- Tropical storm (SSHWS)
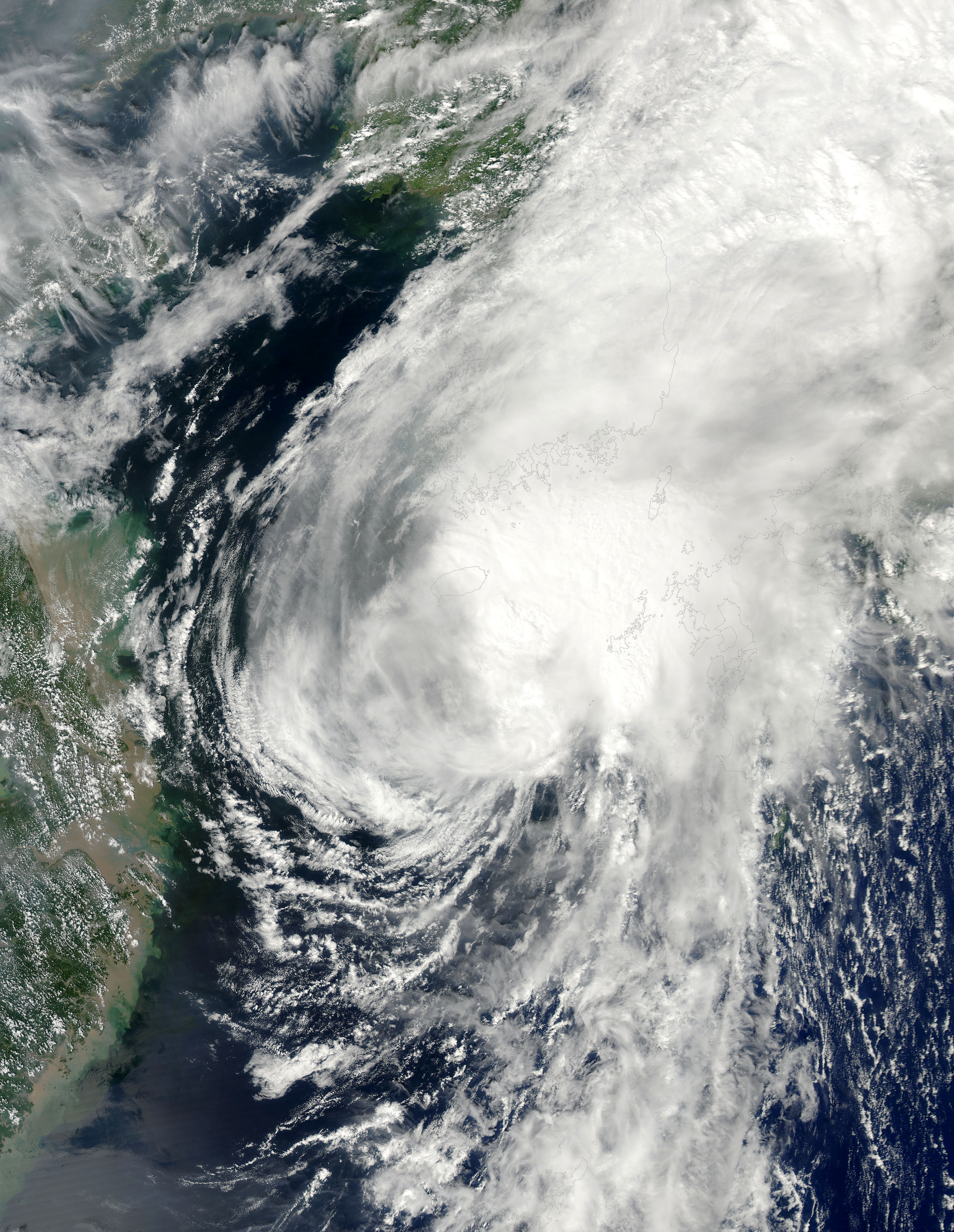
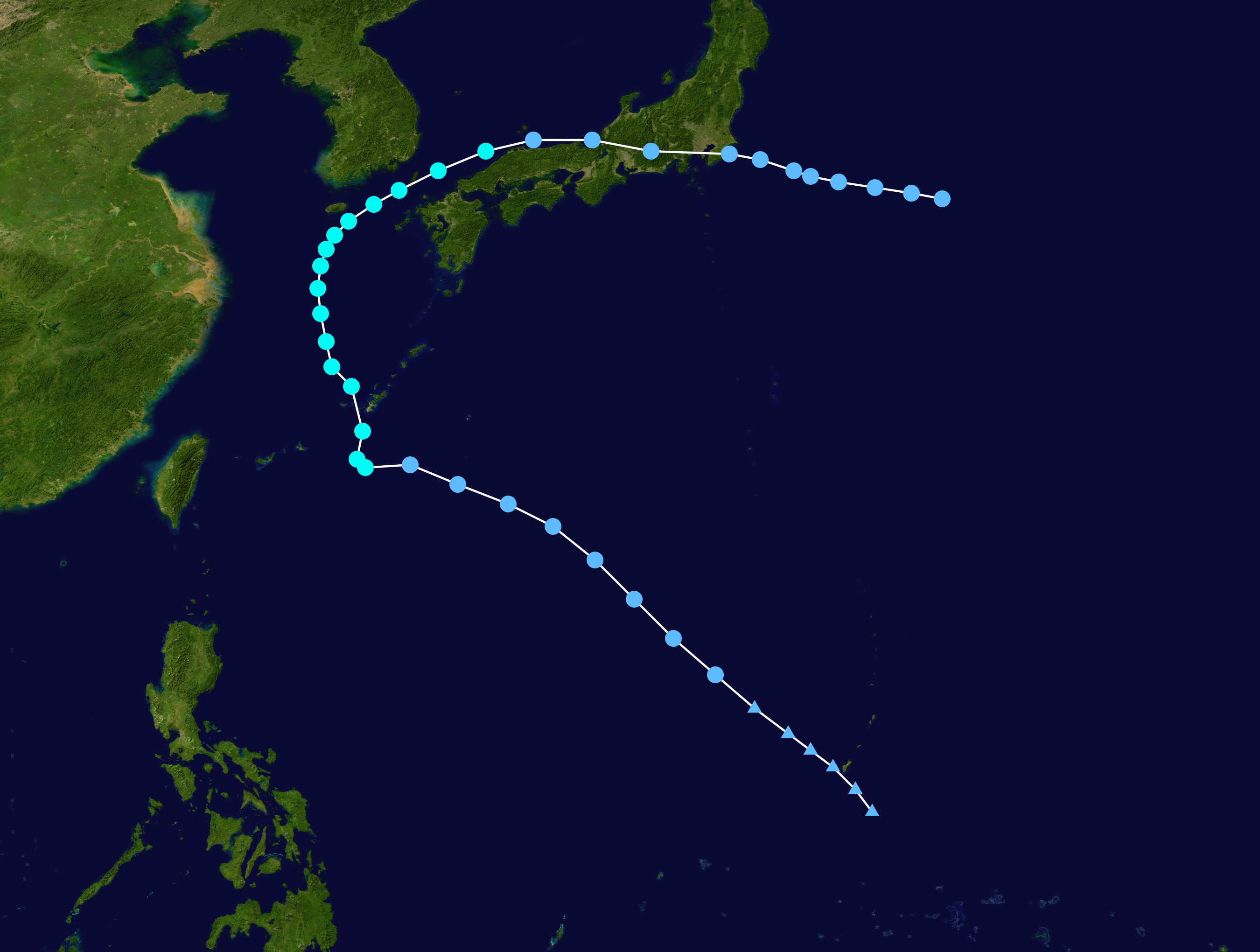
- Duration: September 1 – September 10
- Peak intensity: 95 km/h (60 mph) (10-min); 992 hPa (mbar)

Malou started out as a tropical depression wandering around the Western Pacific. It moved into the Philippine Area of Responsibility and was given the name Henry. It remained for a depression for two days before it strengthened into a tropical storm and was given the name Malou. Malou drifted over the Okinawa Islands and became a severe tropical storm. After passing through the Okinawa Islands, Malou was expected to make a landfall on Jeju Island; instead, it turned northeast and landed on Tsushima Island as a tropical storm on September 7. It then moved along the coast of Honshū and made another landfall near Tsuruga, Fukui Prefecture, Japan on September 8. After the second landfall, Malou weakened into a tropical depression over Shizuoka Prefecture. Nevertheless, it lingered over Kantō region and caused heavy rain in Greater Tokyo Area until it transitioned into a polar low on September 10.

Off the northeastern coast of China, an oil rig was knocked on a 45 degree angle by large waves produced by Tropical Storm Malou. The severe tilting sent 32 workers overboard, although 30 of them were quickly rescued. In Japan, Malou produced record heavy rains, exceeding 100 mm (3.9 in) per hour, resulting in severe flash flooding. Several rivers burst their banks and inundated nearby areas. A few bridges were destroyed; however, no loss of life took place. The rains also brought an end to one of the hottest and longest heat waves in Japanese history. Southwest of Tokyo, roughly 10,000 people were advised to evacuate their homes due to the threat of dangerous flash floods and landslides.

=== Severe Tropical Storm Meranti ===
- Severe tropical storm (JMA)
- Category 1 typhoon (SSHWS)
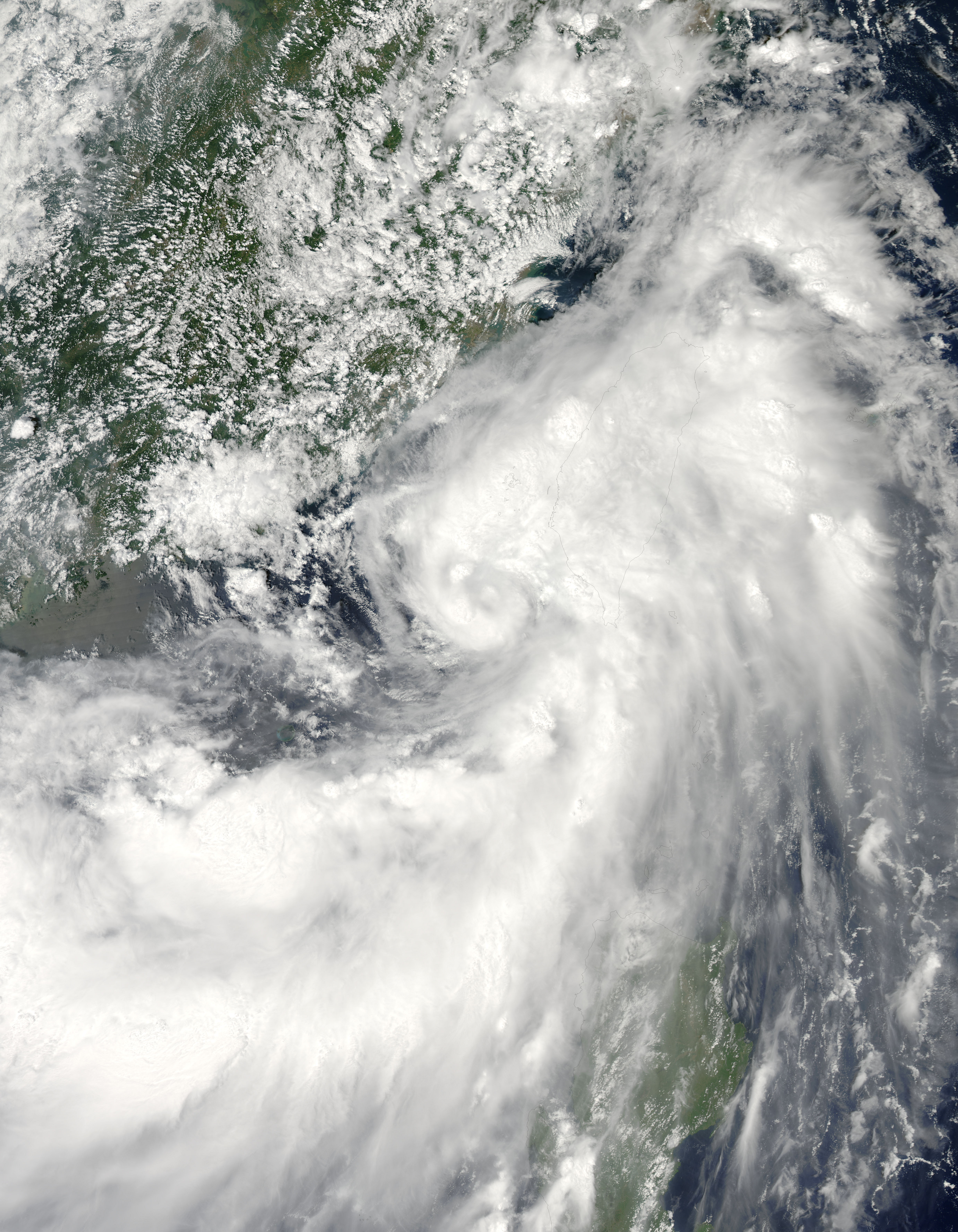
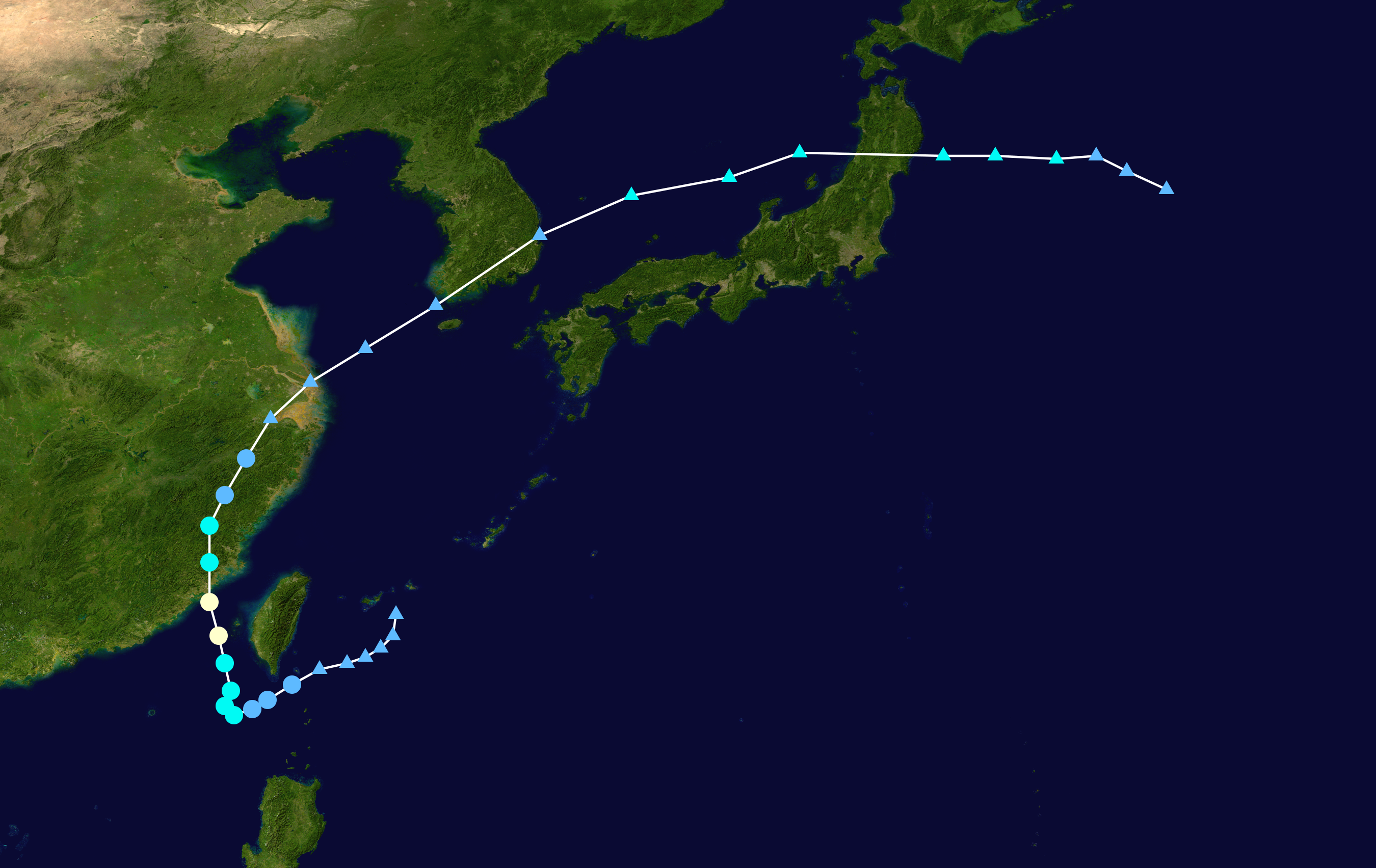
- Duration: September 6 – September 10
- Peak intensity: 100 km/h (65 mph) (10-min); 985 hPa (mbar)

Early on September 6, the JMA reported that a tropical depression had formed about 330 km (210 mi) to the southeast of Taipei, Taiwan. Later that day the JTWC started to monitor the system and reported that the depression, had an unorganized low level circulation center that had convection flaring over it and was located in a favorable environment of decreasing vertical windshear and high sea surface temperatures. During the next day as the depression moved towards Taiwan the system became better organized with a Tropical Cyclone Formation Alert issued later that day. In the morning of September 9, JMA upgraded the cyclone into a tropical storm, and it was named Meranti. After Meranti was upgraded into a tropical storm, it continued to move northward into Taiwan Strait. Early on September 10, Meranti made a landfall at Shishi City, Quanzhou, Fujian Province, China. It continued to move north toward inland Fujian. In the evening of September 10, the JMA downgraded Meranti into a tropical depression.

In Hong Kong, a violent thunderstorm associated with Meranti produced a record 13,102 strikes of lightning in one hour. Several skyscrapers were struck by lightning, resulting in five incidents of people becoming trapped in stalled-out elevators. Torrential rains, exceeding 40 mm (1.6 in) per hour triggered flash flooding and wind gusts up to 100 km/h (62 mph) were recorded.

In post-storm analysis, the JMA upgraded Meranti into a severe tropical storm. In East China, a total of 3 people were killed and total economic losses were counted to be CNY 800.3 million(US$118.125 million).

=== Typhoon Fanapi (Inday) ===
- Very strong typhoon (JMA)
- Category 3 typhoon (SSHWS)
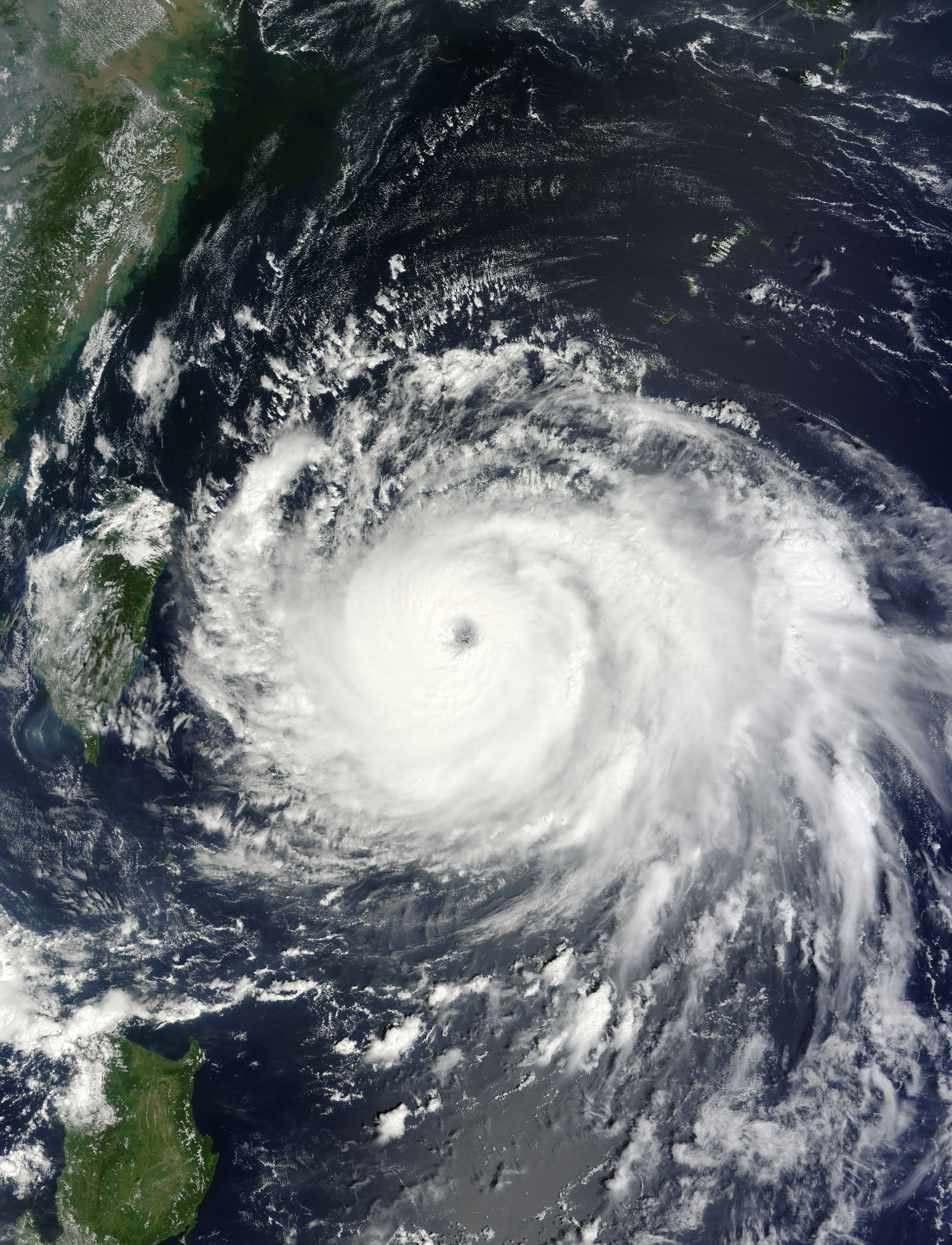
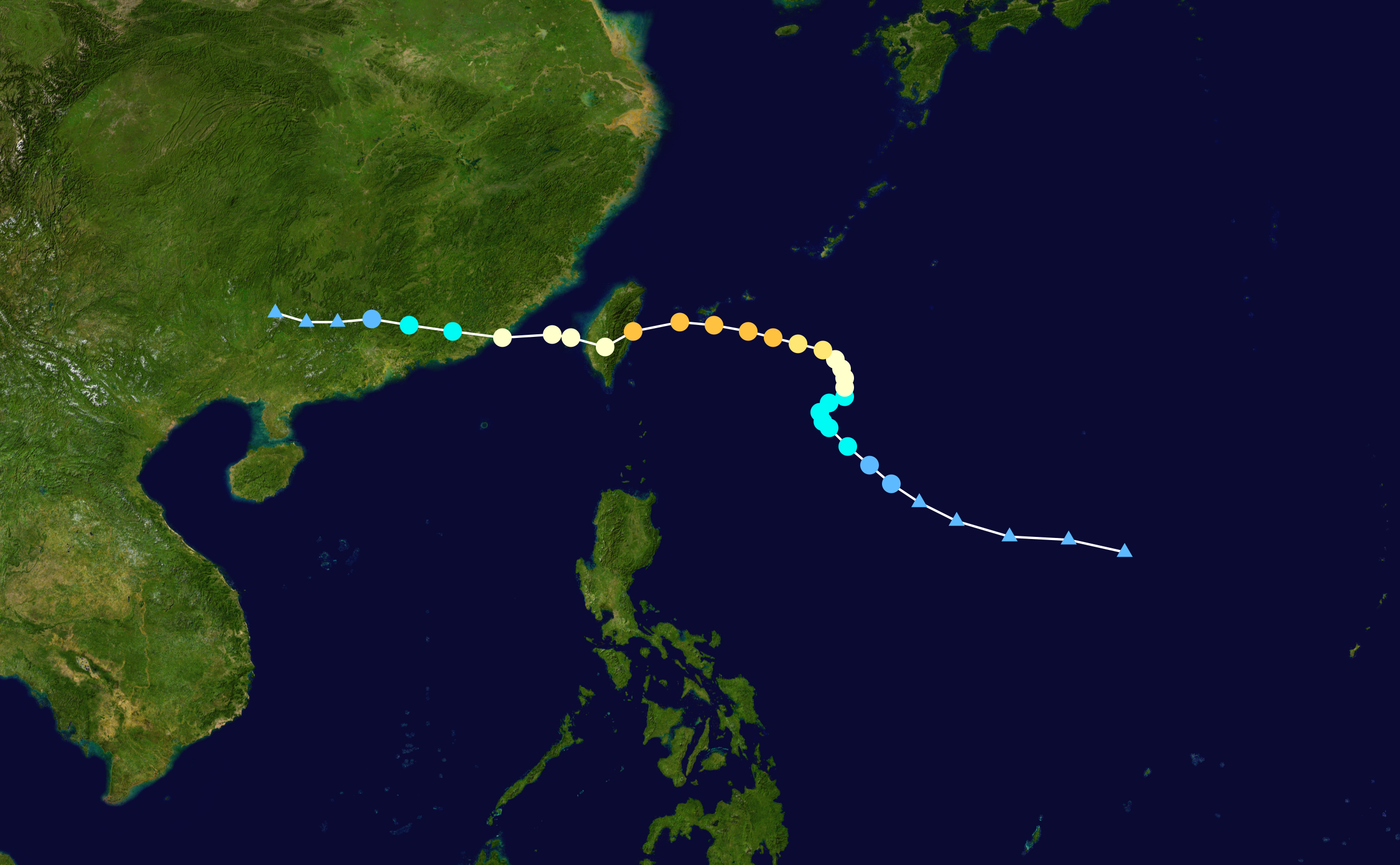
- Duration: September 14 – September 21
- Peak intensity: 175 km/h (110 mph) (10-min); 930 hPa (mbar)

Late on September 14, the JMA reported that a tropical depression had formed southeast of Taiwan, and the JTWC soon designated it as 12W with the PAGASA naming it Inday shortly thereafter. Later that day, both the JMA and the JTWC upgraded the system to a tropical storm and named it Fanapi. On September 16, the storm intensified into a typhoon and turned northwest. On September 18, Fanapi further intensified to a category 3 typhoon and moved straight into Taiwan. It made landfall over Hualien County early on September 19. Because of land interaction, Fanapi moved southwest, again turned west and weakened into a severe tropical storm. After staying inland for about nine hours, Fanapi moved to the Taiwan Strait and made its second landfall over Zhangpu in Fujian, China. Late on September 20, Fanapi weakened into a tropical depression over Guangdong, China, and it dissipated completely on the next day. Fanapi caused $1 billion of damages and claimed a total of 105 lives across China and Taiwan.

=== Typhoon Malakas ===
- Very strong typhoon (JMA)
- Category 2 typhoon (SSHWS)
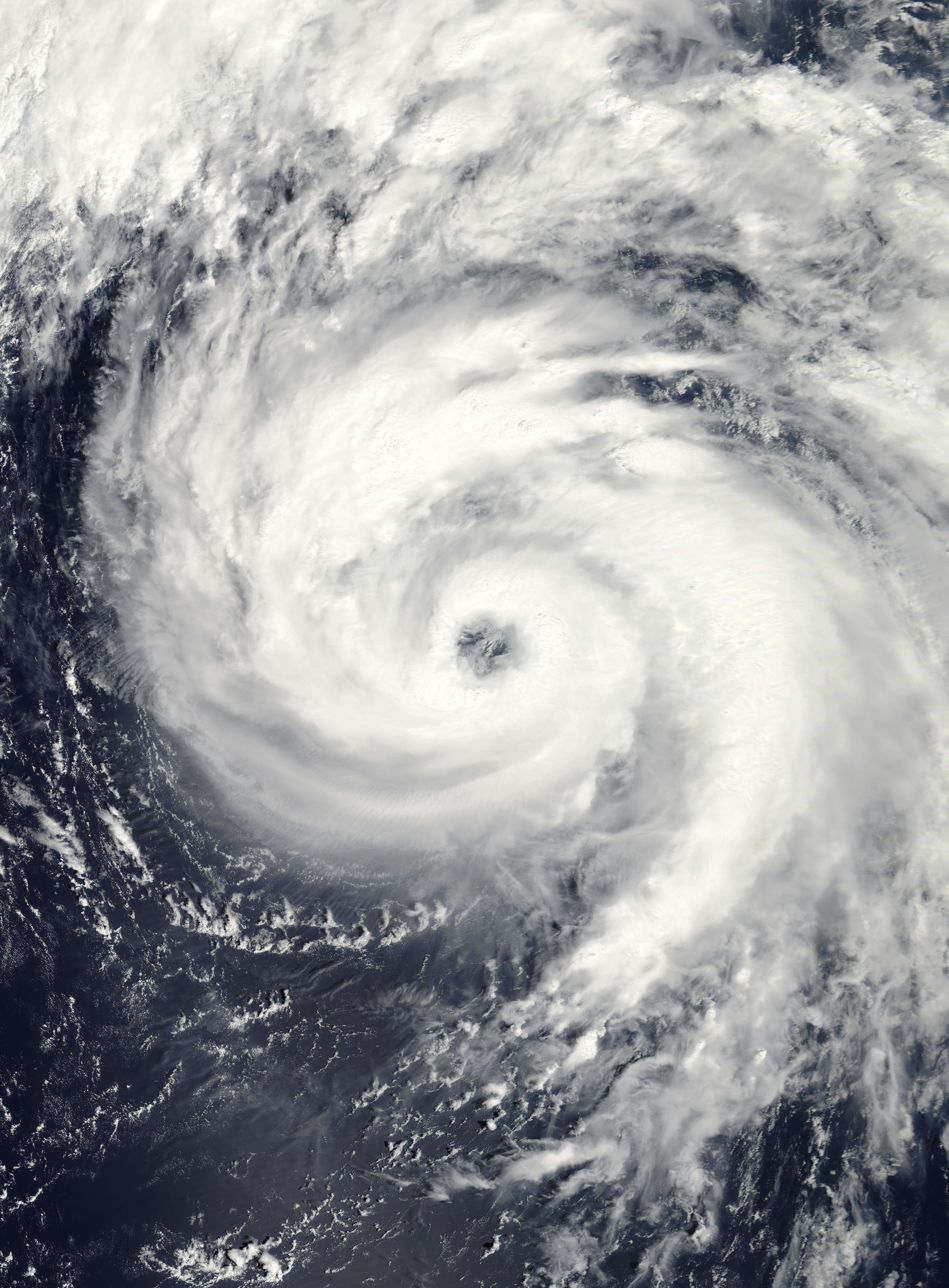
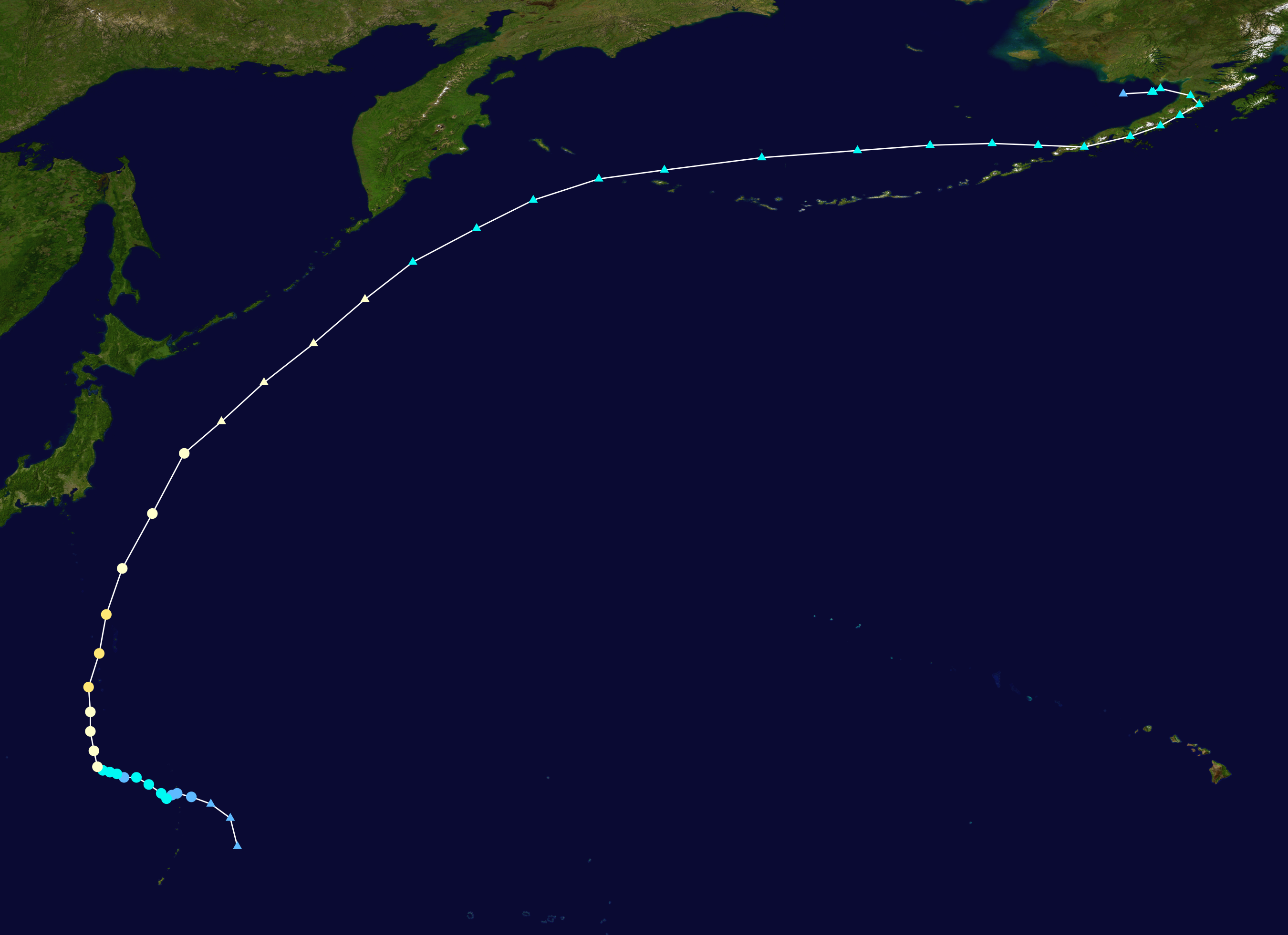
- Duration: September 20 – September 25
- Peak intensity: 155 km/h (100 mph) (10-min); 945 hPa (mbar)

On September 20, the JTWC had reported that a Tropical Depression had formed and designated it with 13W. Later on the same day, the depression strengthened slightly. The next day, JMA started monitoring the depression while the JTWC upgraded it into a Tropical Storm. Later on the same day, the JMA further upgraded it into a tropical storm naming it "Malakas". On September 22, the storm strengthened further and moved towards the Japanese Islands. The next day, the storm intensified into a Severe tropical storm. The JTWC directly upgraded the storm into a Typhoon that time. Later on that day, the JTWC reported that the Typhoon weakened to a tropical storm unexpectedly. By the next day, the storm reintensified into a Category 1 typhoon and further intensified into a Category 2 typhoon on the SSHS. The JMA also reported that the system had intensified into a Typhoon. By the next day, the JTWC reported that the storm had weakened into a Category 1 typhoon issuing its final warning while the JMA announced the storms closest approach to Japan. The system later transitioned into a powerful extratropical cyclone on September 25, which stalled near Alaska for a few days, until it was absorbed by a larger extratropical storm on October 1.

=== Tropical Depression 14W ===
- Tropical depression (JMA)
- Tropical depression (SSHWS)
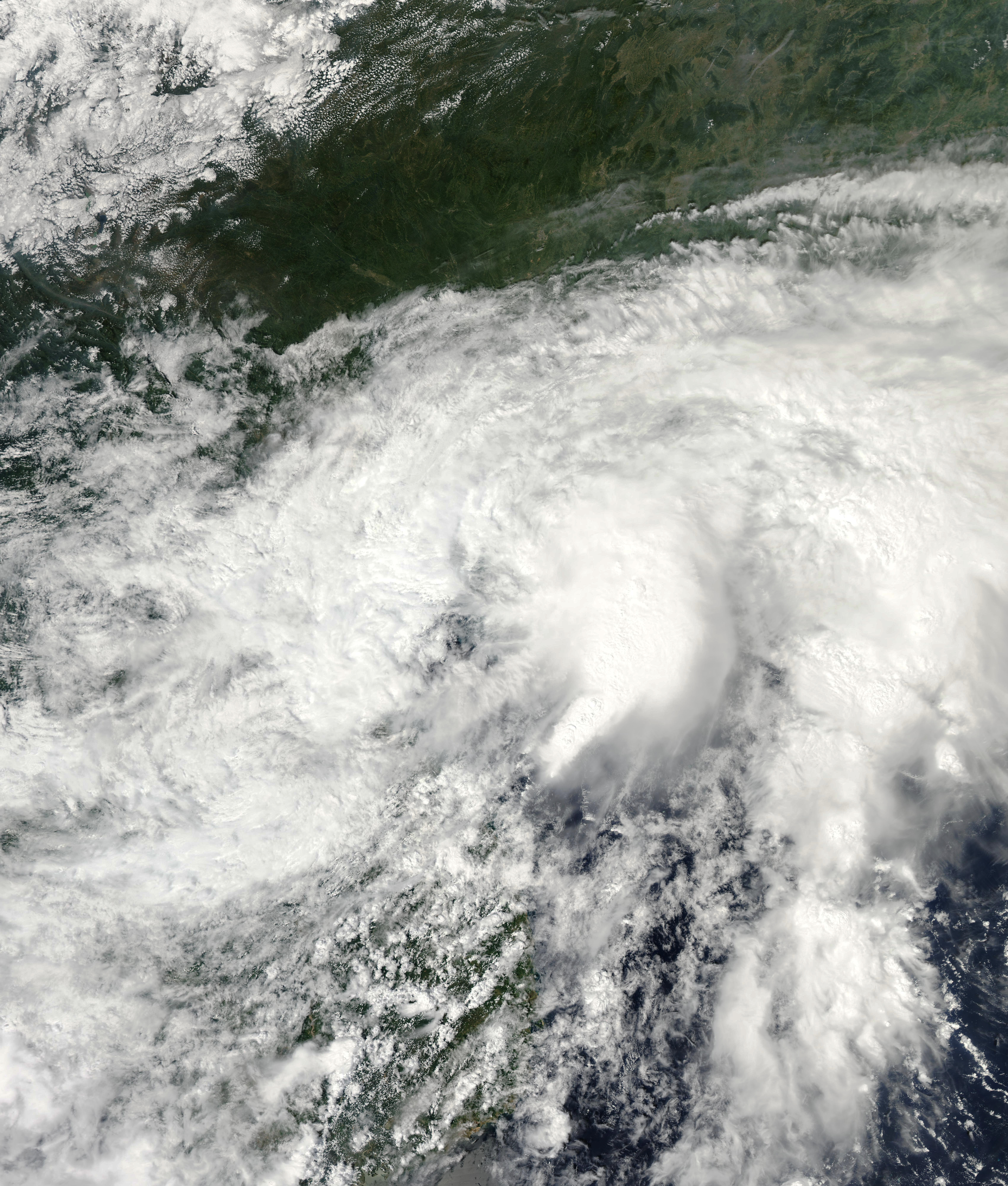
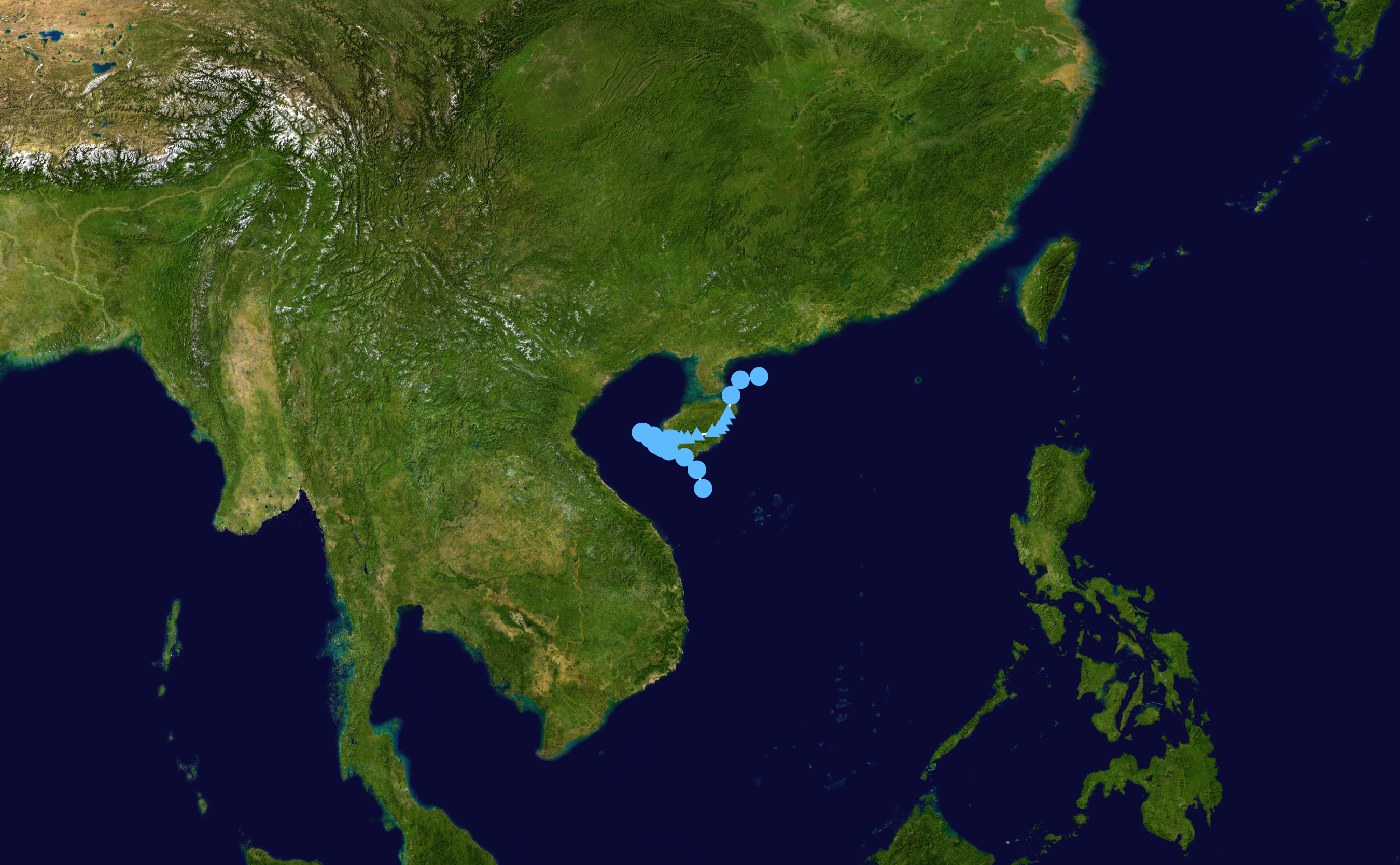
- Duration: October 5 – October 10
- Peak intensity: 55 km/h (35 mph) (10-min); 1004 hPa (mbar)

On October 5, the JTWC reported that a tropical depression had formed from a low pressure in the South China Sea. The depression made landfall without any warnings, no damage or deaths have been reported in that day. The depression maintained full strength and didn't weaken as it moved farther inland. However, as it approached South China on October 6, the depression began weakening and the final warning was issued for the system. The system continued to weaken as it made landfall on South China on October 7, and moved back over the South China Sea. Later on the same day, the depression degenerated to the remnant low. The system continued to drift in the South China Sea for the 4 days. During this time, the remnant low regenerated slightly, but didn't restrengthen into a tropical depression, and the system dissipated on October 11 near Hong Kong.

=== Typhoon Megi (Juan) ===
- Violent typhoon (JMA)
- Category 5 super typhoon (SSHWS)
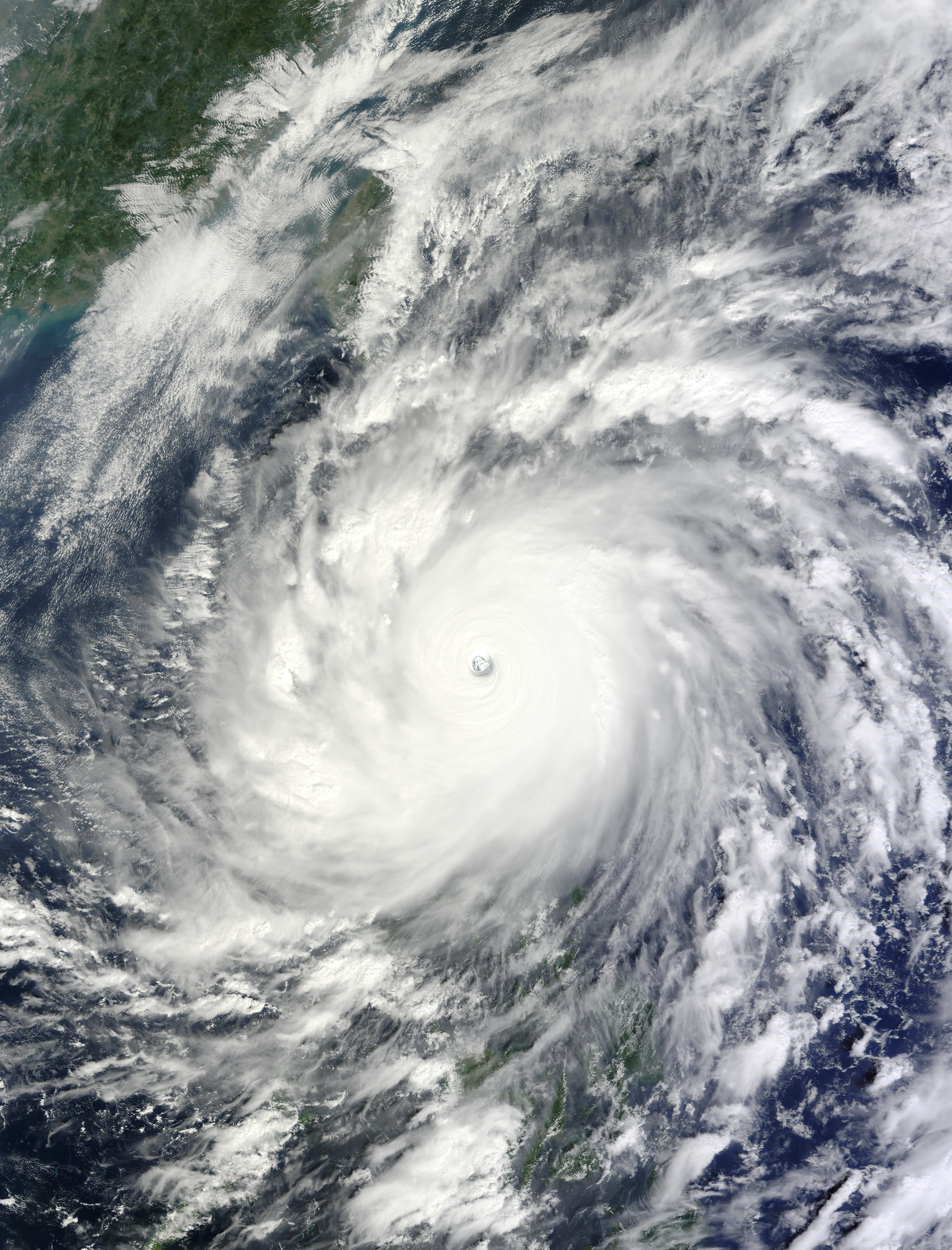
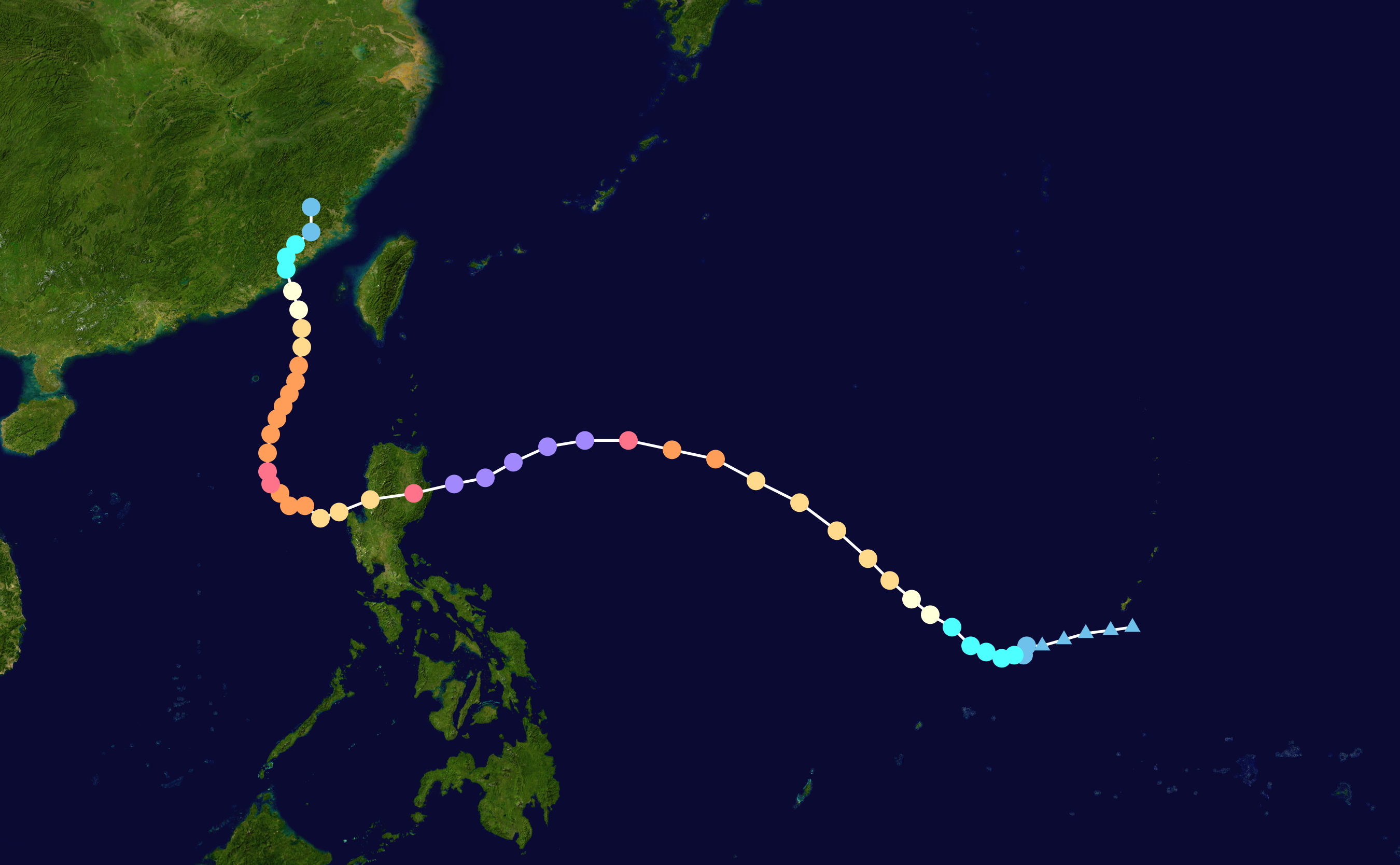
- Duration: October 12 – October 24
- Peak intensity: 230 km/h (145 mph) (10-min); 885 hPa (mbar)

Late on October 12, JMA reported that a tropical depression formed west of Guam. During October 13, JTWC designated the tropical depression as 15W. Later that day, the system intensified into a tropical storm named Megi by JMA. On October 14, JTWC upgraded it to a typhoon, so did JMA on the next day. Later, PAGASA began to issue advisories on Megi and named it Juan. Early on October 17, JTWC upgraded Megi to a Category 5 super typhoon— the only super typhoon in 2010 and the first since Nida in 2009. According to RSMC Best Track Data, Megi attained peak intensity at 18Z and 00Z. Megi made landfall over Luzon early on October 18.

By passing Luzon and reaching the South China Sea, Megi significantly weakened on October 18 and 19. Because of low vertical wind shear and good radial outflow, the typhoon intensified again on October 20 and reached its second peak intensity on October 21. Due to subsidence and increasing vertical wind shear, Megi began to weaken on October 22. Megi made landfall over Zhangpu in Fujian, China and weakened to a tropical storm on October 23. Later that day, Megi further weakened to a tropical depression before dissipating completely on October 24. Megi killed 69 people and left 4 people missing or possibly dead.

=== Typhoon Chaba (Katring) ===
- Very strong typhoon (JMA)
- Category 4 typhoon (SSHWS)
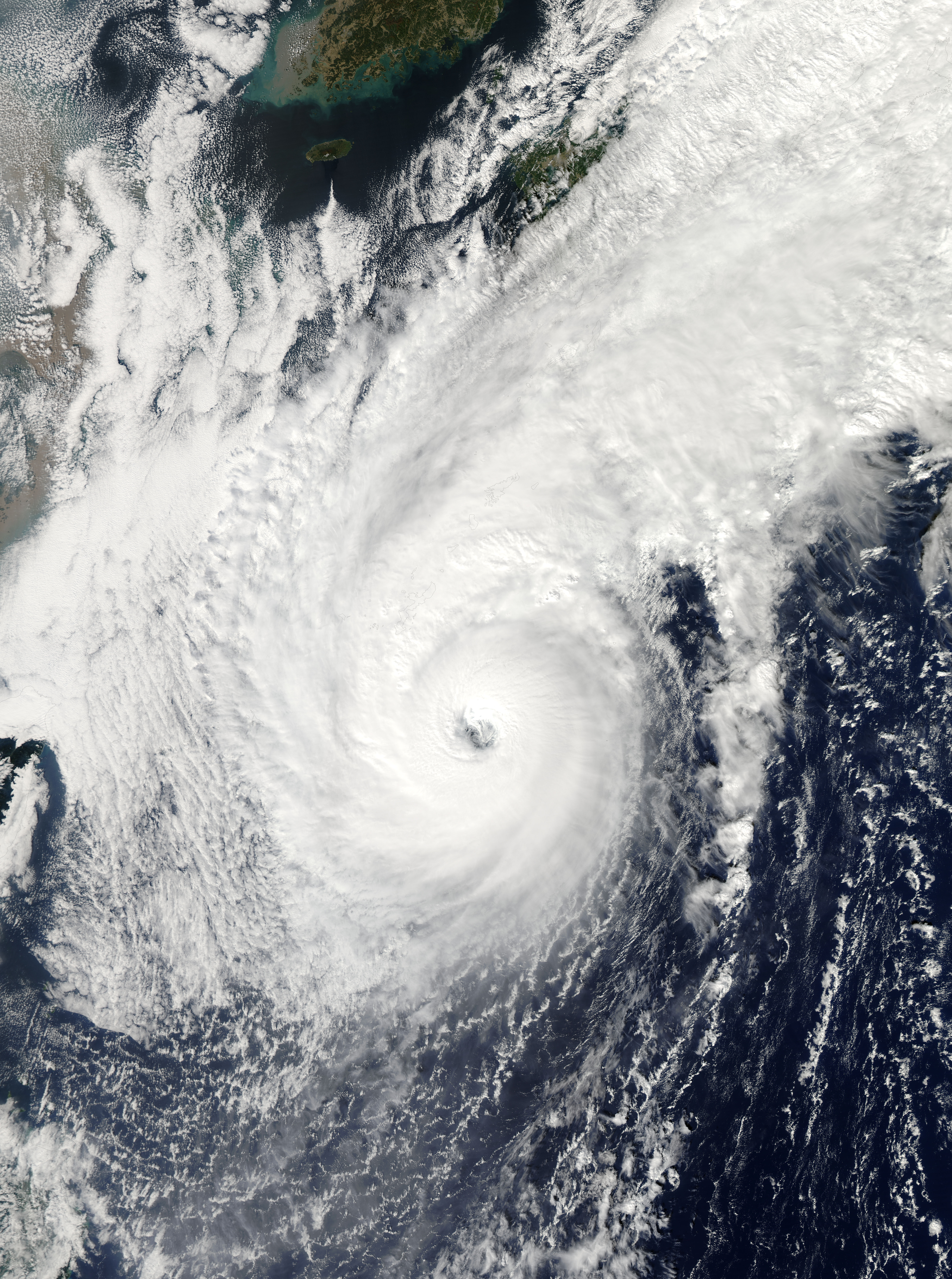
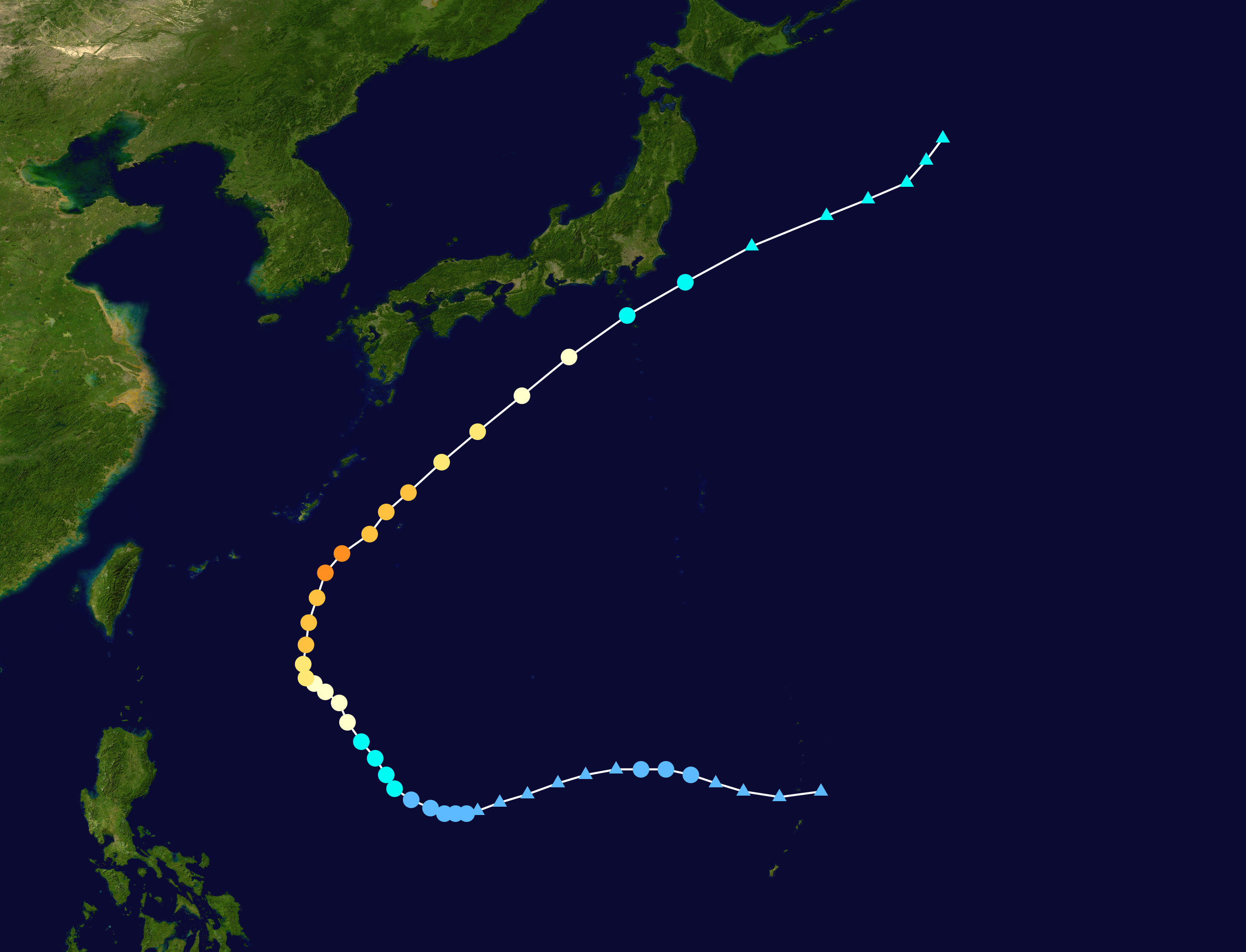
- Duration: October 20 – October 30
- Peak intensity: 175 km/h (110 mph) (10-min); 930 hPa (mbar)

Early on October 20, the Japan Meteorological Agency (JMA) upgraded an area of low pressure into a tropical depression. Later that day, the JMA reported that the tropical depression slightly intensified. The next day, the Joint Typhoon Warning Center started monitoring the system as tropical depression 16W. On October 23, the system entered the Philippine Area of responsibility and the Philippine Atmospheric, Geophysical and Astronomical Services Administration (PAGASA) started monitoring the system as Tropical Depression "Katring" On October 24, the JMA and JTWC upgraded the tropical depression into a tropical storm and the JMA named it "Chaba". On October 25, the JMA further upgraded the storm into a Severe Tropical Storm. Later that day, the JTWC upgraded the storm into a Category 1 Typhoon. Early on October 26, the JMA further upgraded the storm into a Typhoon. Early on October 27, the JTWC upgraded the typhoon into a Category 2 Typhoon. The following day the JTWC upgraded the system into a Category 4 Typhoon, but soon after weakened back to a Category 3. Late on October 29, the JMA had downgraded the typhoon into a Severe Tropical Storm while the JTWC downgraded it into a Category 1 Typhoon. Early on October 30, the JTWC reported that Chaba had transitioned into an extratropical cyclone. During the afternoon of October 30, the JMA downgraded Chaba to a remnant low as passed near Japan. The remnants of Chaba continued to weaken rapidly as it slowly moved northwest, until it dissipated completely on October 31.

=== Tropical Depression 17W ===
- Tropical depression (JMA)
- Tropical depression (SSHWS)
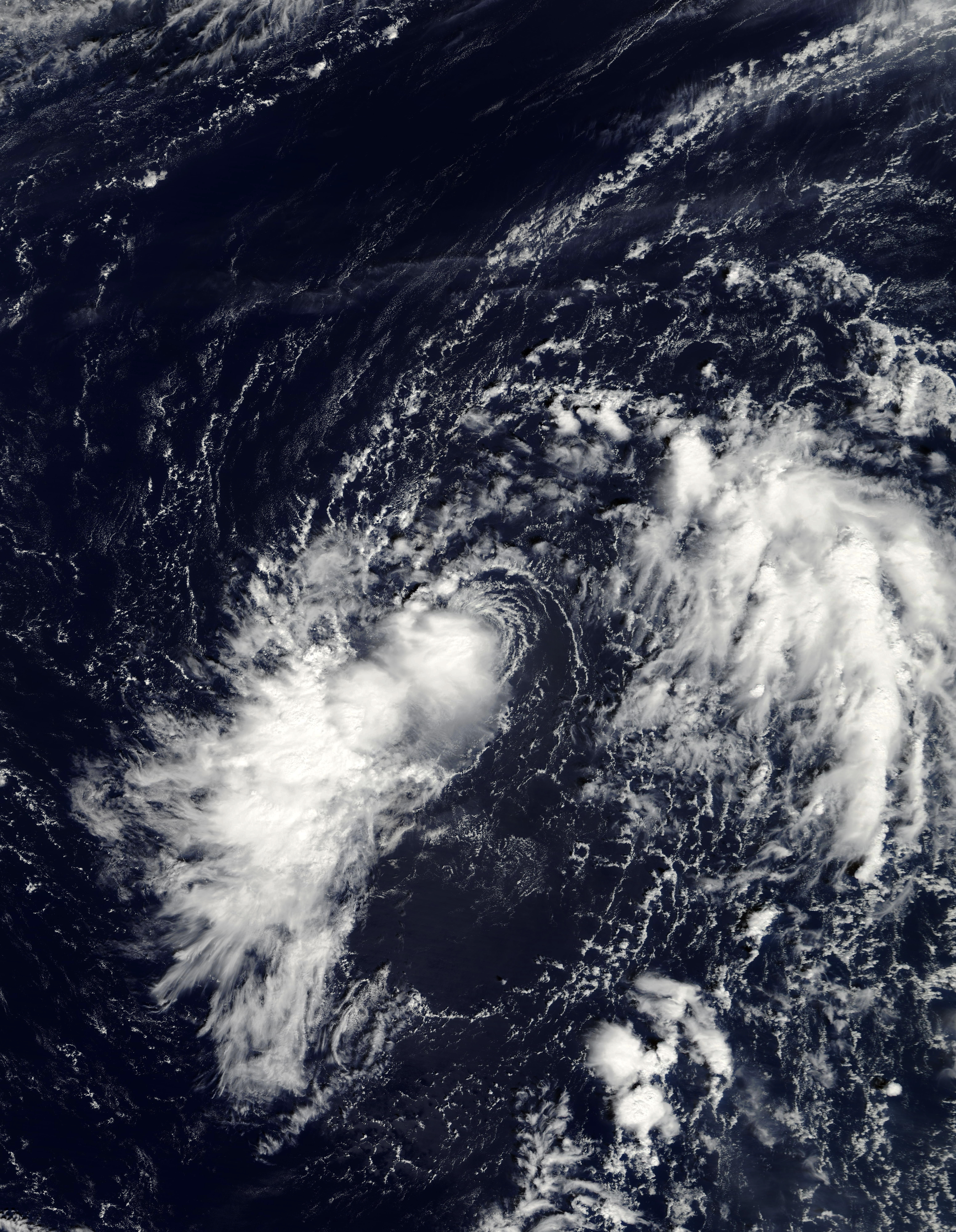
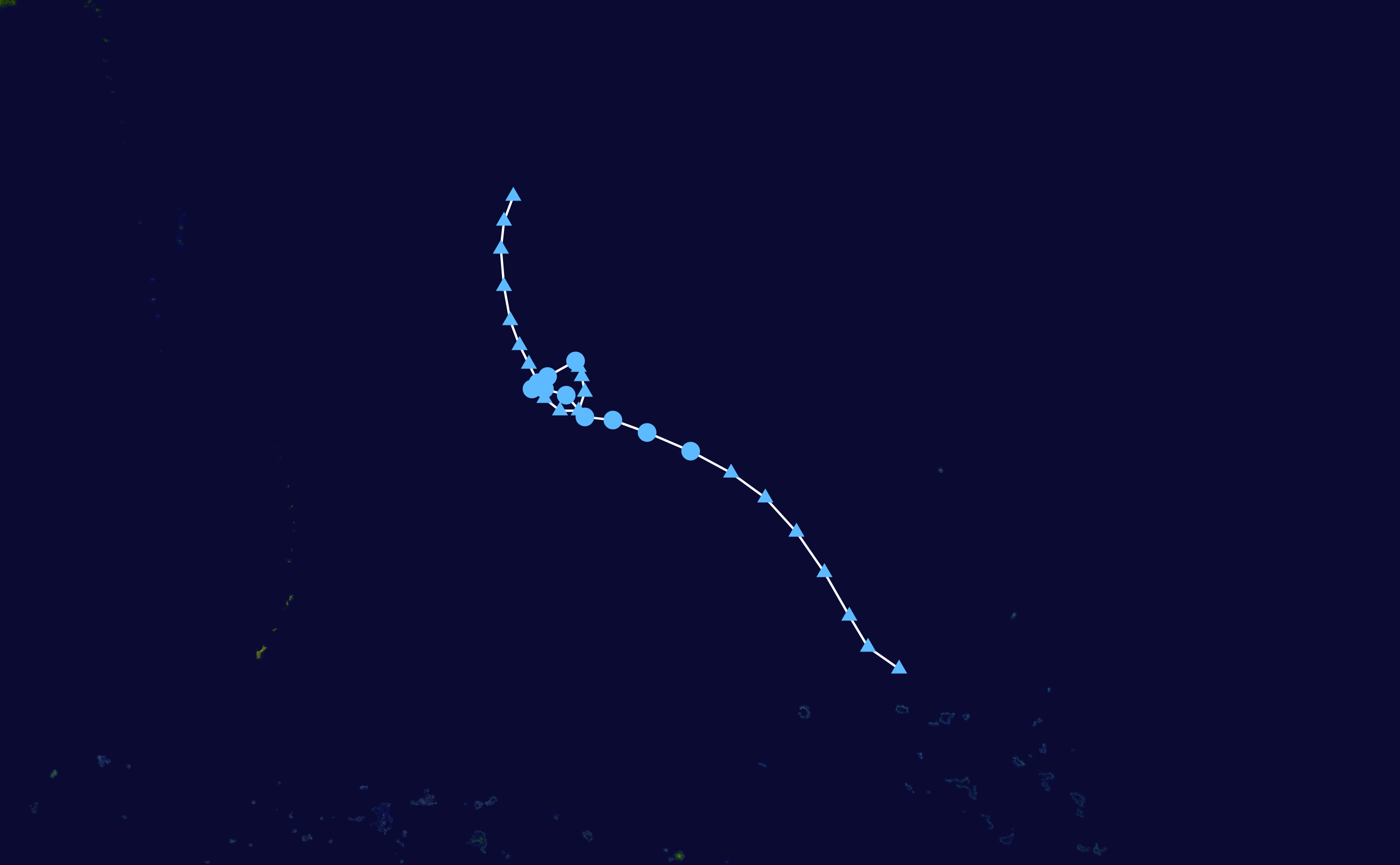
- Duration: October 20 – October 27
- Peak intensity: 55 km/h (35 mph) (10-min); 1004 hPa (mbar)

Early on October 20, the Japan Meteorological Agency (JMA) upgraded an area of low pressure into a tropical depression. Late on the next day, the Joint Typhoon Warning Center (JTWC) identified the same system as Tropical Depression 17W. On October 23, the JTWC downgraded the depression into a remnant low. Early on October 26, the JMA issued their final advisory on the depression. However, early, the next day the JMA reported that the system had re-intensified into a tropical depression and reissuing advisories on it, whilst it was located about 1,400 km (870 mi) to the southwest of Chiba, Japan. However, later that day, the depression weakened to a remnant low, with the JMA issuing their final advisory on the system. The remnants of the depression dissipated completely early on October 28.

=== Tropical Depression 18W ===
- Tropical depression (JMA)
- Tropical depression (SSHWS)
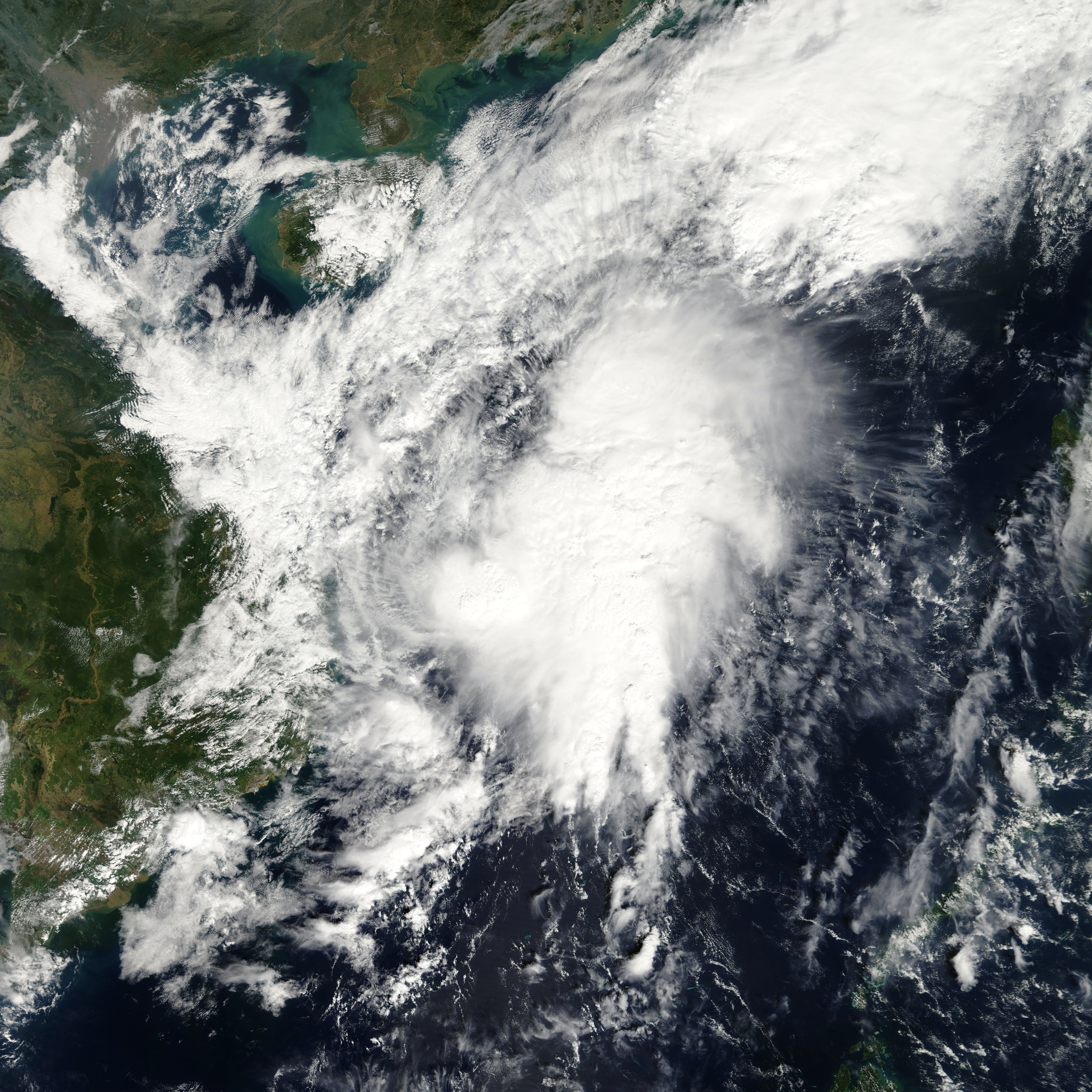
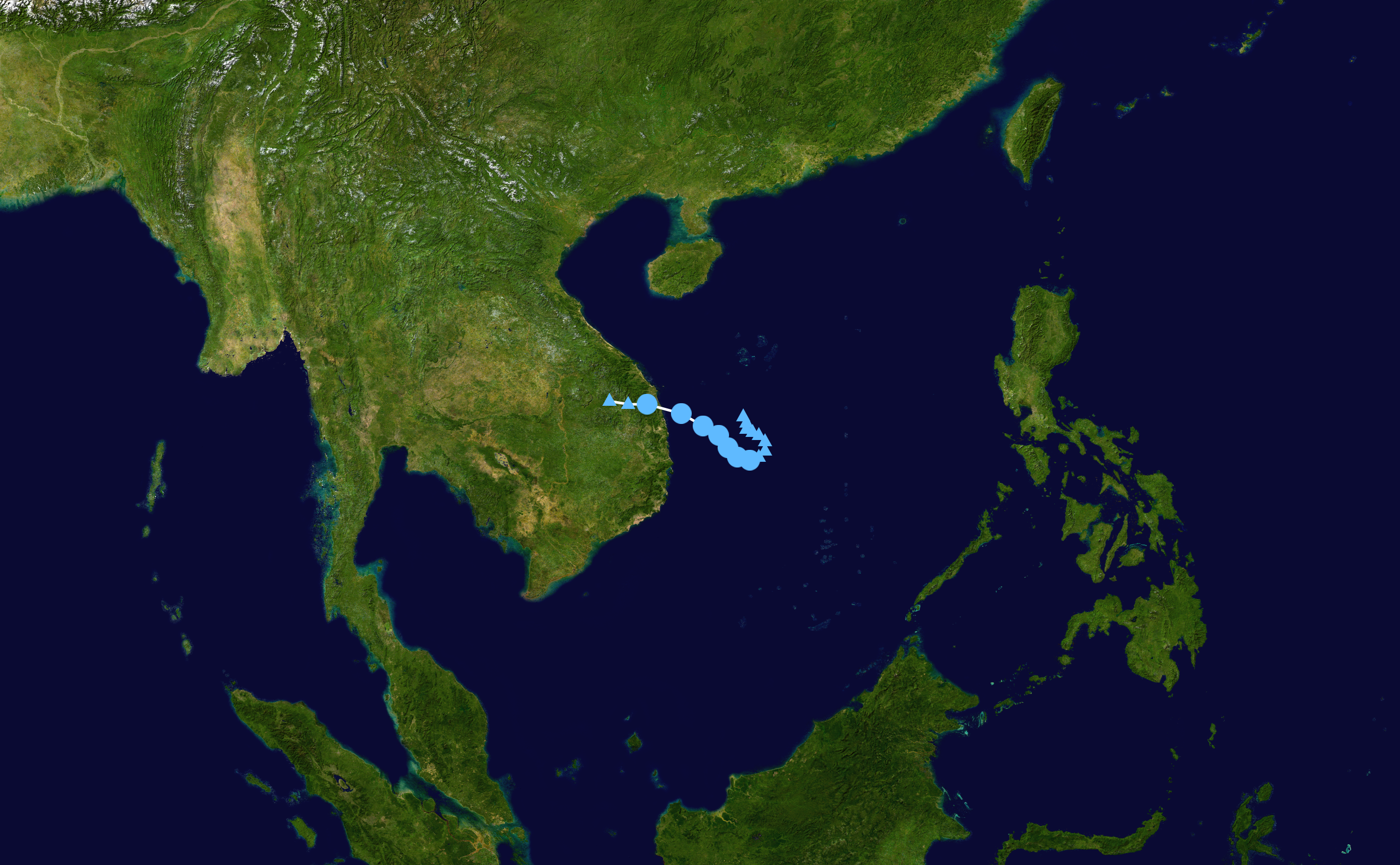
- Duration: November 12 – November 14
- Peak intensity: 55 km/h (35 mph) (10-min); 1004 hPa (mbar)

On November 10, an area of low pressure associated with a monsoon trough formed in the central South China Sea. On November 11, the low-pressure area became a strong tropical disturbance wave. During the next day, the Japan Meteorological Agency (JMA) reported that the system had intensified into a Tropical Depression. Later that day, JTWC issued Tropical Cyclone Formation Alert for system, and eventually, it was numbered Tropical Depression 18W. It made landfall south of Da Nang, Vietnam on November 14, and it dissipated later in the day.

=== Tropical Depression 19W ===
- Tropical depression (JMA)
- Tropical depression (SSHWS)
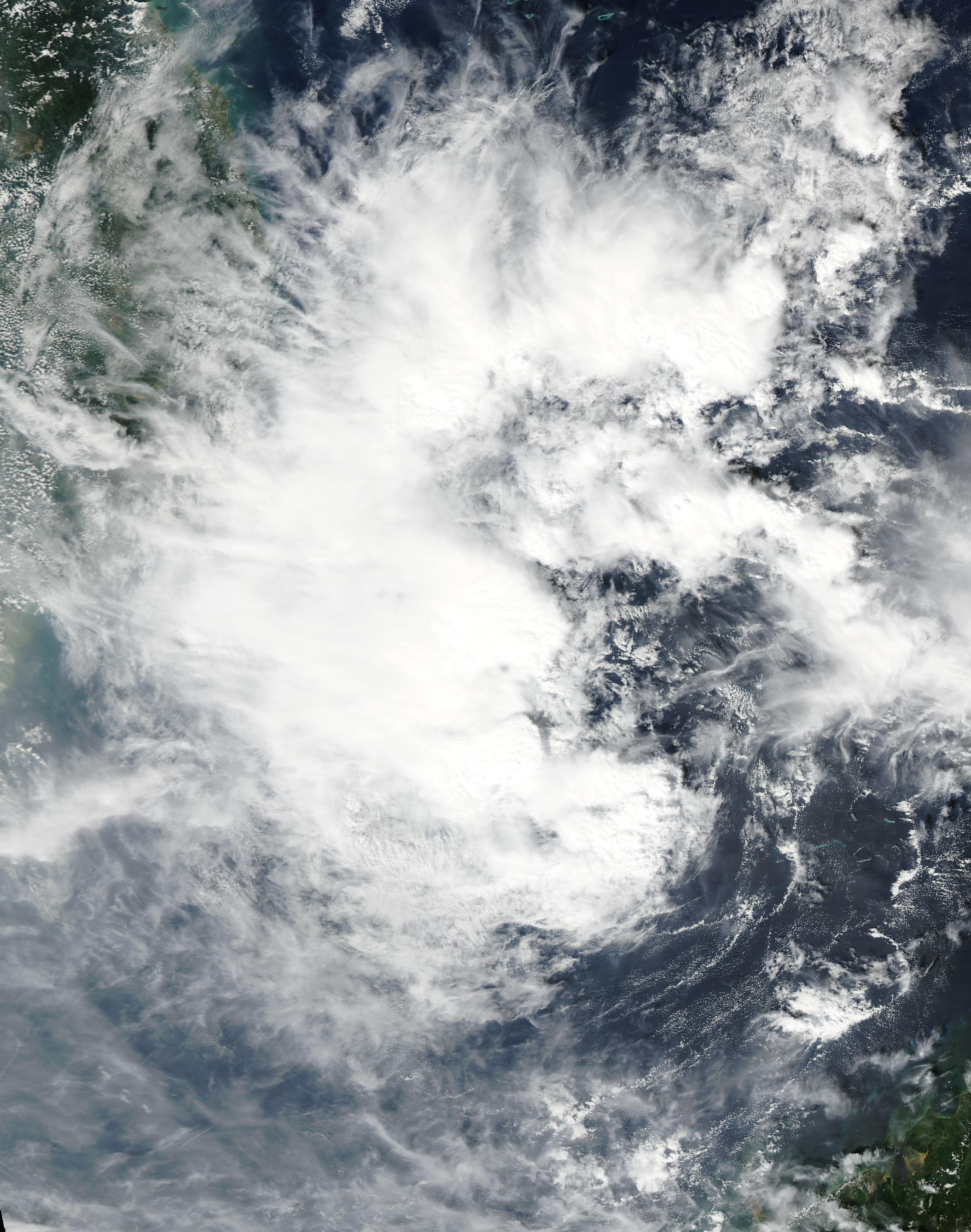
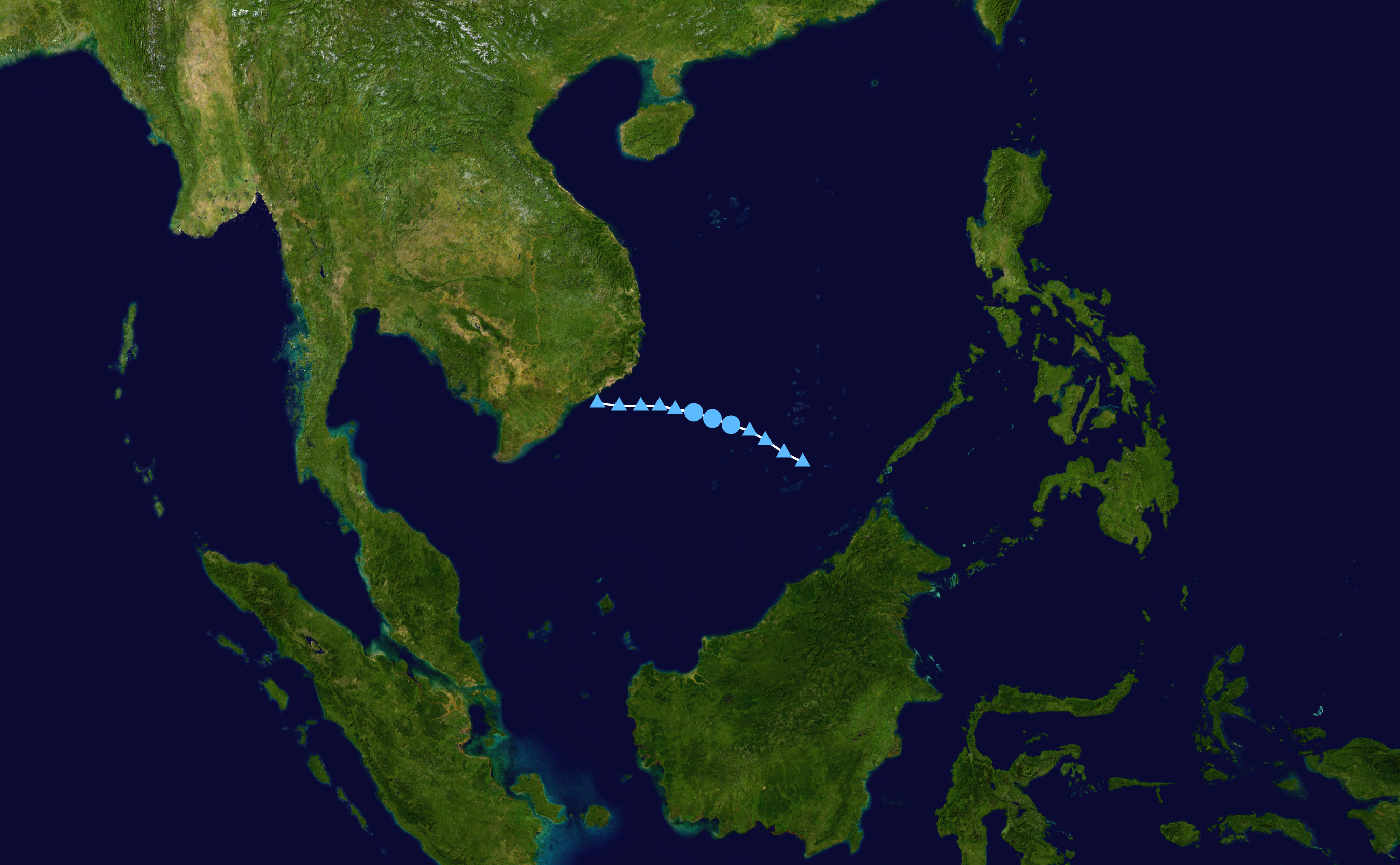
- Duration: December 12 – December 13
- Peak intensity: 55 km/h (35 mph) (10-min); 1002 hPa (mbar)

On December 11, an area of low pressure associated with a monsoon trough formed in the south of South China Sea. Later that day, the low-pressure area became a strong tropical disturbance wave. During the next day, the Joint Typhoon Warning Center (JTWC) reported that the system had intensified into Tropical Depression 19W, while the JMA upgraded the system to a tropical depression. On December 13, JTWC and the JMA both issued their last advisory on Tropical Depression 19W, as it dissipated completely over the northwestern part of the South China Sea, without impacting any major land masses.

=== Tropical Depression Omeka ===
- Tropical depression (JMA)
- Subtropical storm (SSHWS)
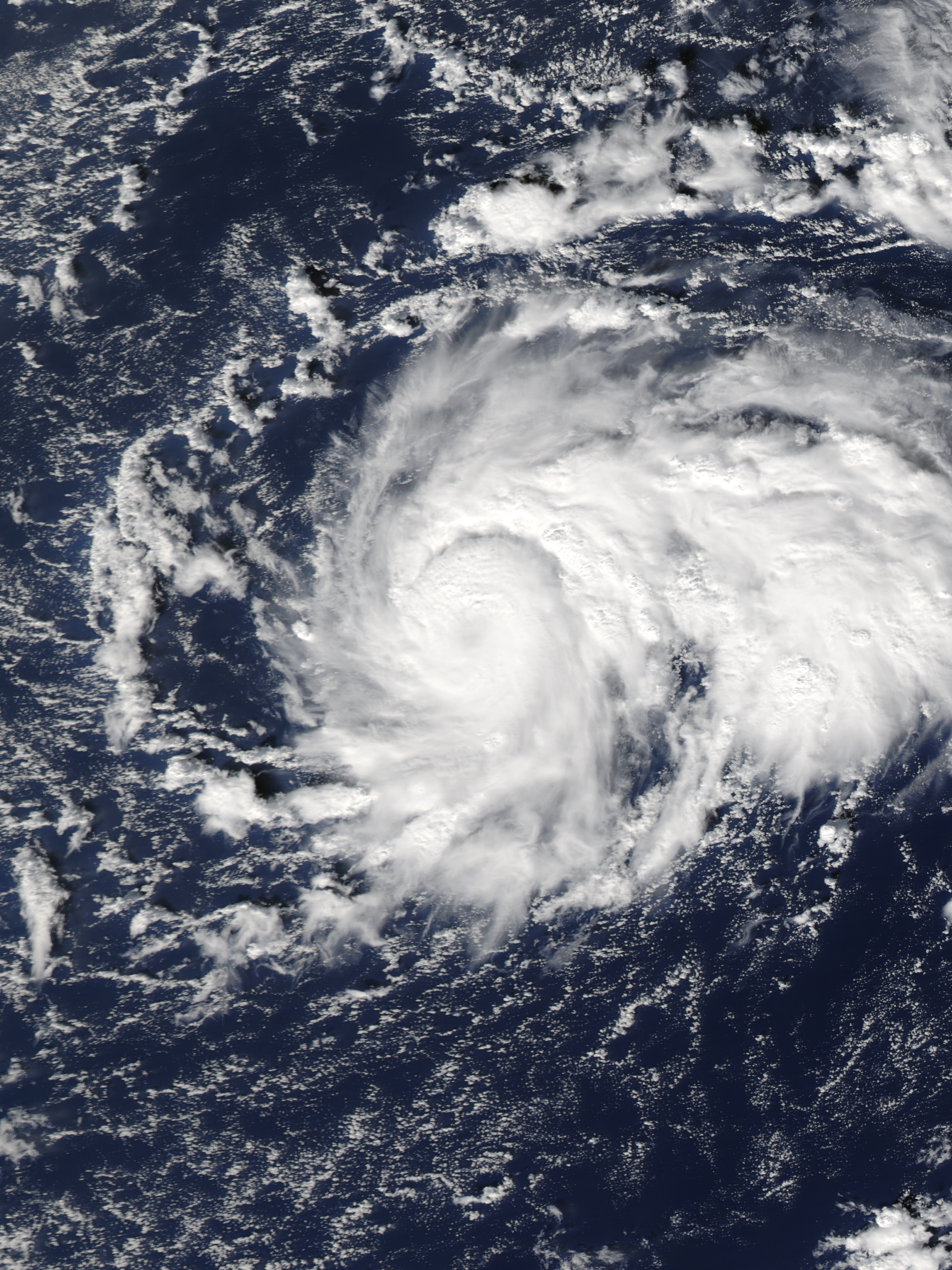
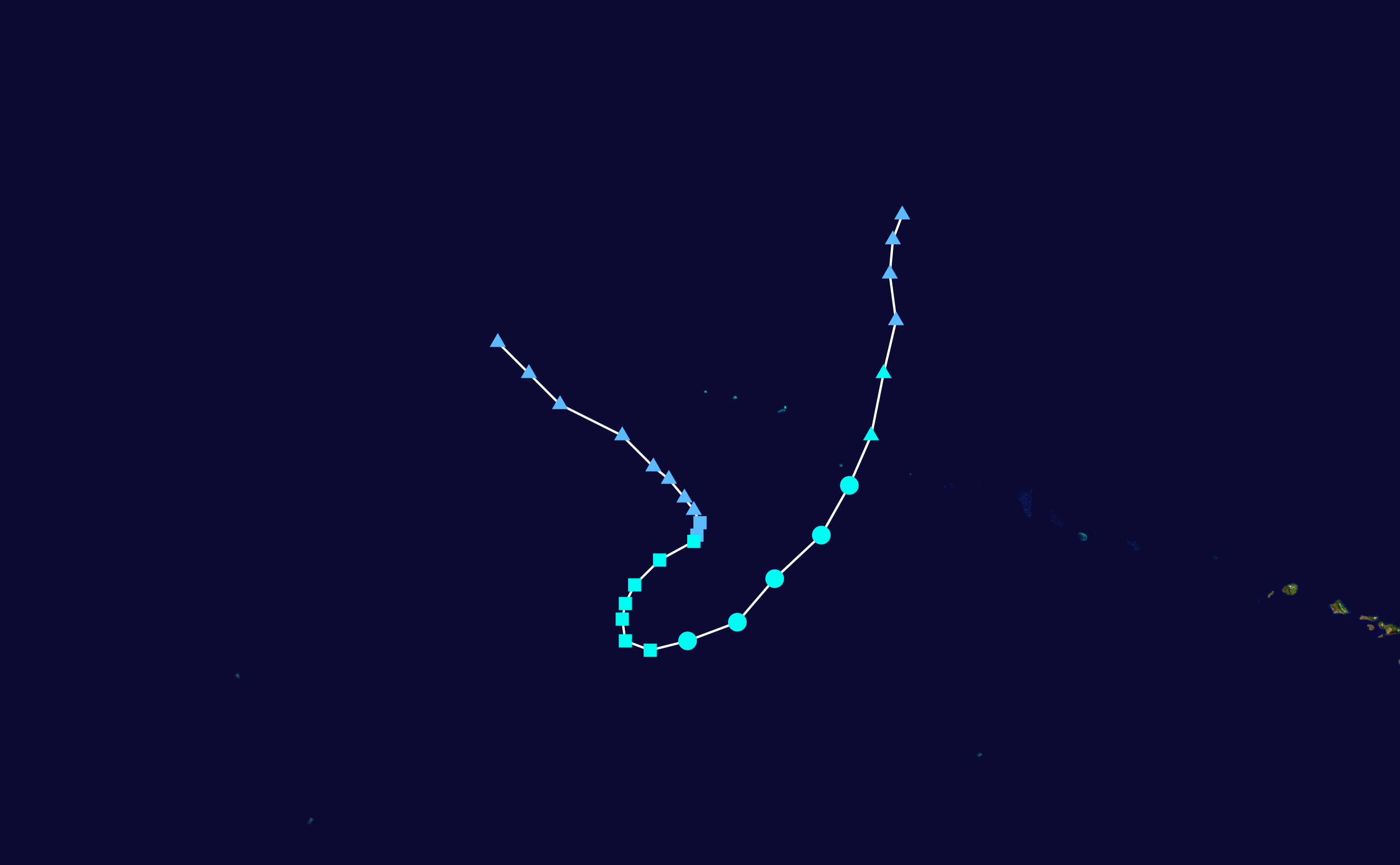
- Duration: December 19 (Entered basin) – December 20 (Exited basin)
- Peak intensity: 55 km/h (35 mph) (10-min); 998 hPa (mbar)

On December 16, an extratropical cyclone developed in the western Pacific Ocean beneath an upper-level low, just west of the International Date Line. The system drifted southeastward, crossing into the Central Pacific on December 17, and developing into a subtropical cyclone. The storm re-entered the Western Pacific on December 19 after turning back to the southwest. An area of warm water temperatures fueled the development of thunderstorms, signaling the system's transition into a tropical cyclone, with an eye-feature in the center. The JMA classified the system as a tropical depression, located about 2,600 km (1,615 mi) to the west of Hilo, Hawaii. The JTWC considered the system as subtropical due to the cold-nature of the circulation, with the presence of dry air from the northwest. The JTWC estimated sustained winds of at least 85 km/h (55 mph) and had a pressure of 990 mbar (hPa). However, there is a disagreement between warning centers on the nature of the system. While west of the dateline, the CPHC and JMA referred to the system as a tropical cyclone while the JTWC considered it a subtropical disturbance. Early on December 20, the system crossed over the International Date Line into the Central Pacific basin, where the CPHC named it Tropical Storm Omeka. The storm lasted three more days before dissipating.

=== Other systems ===
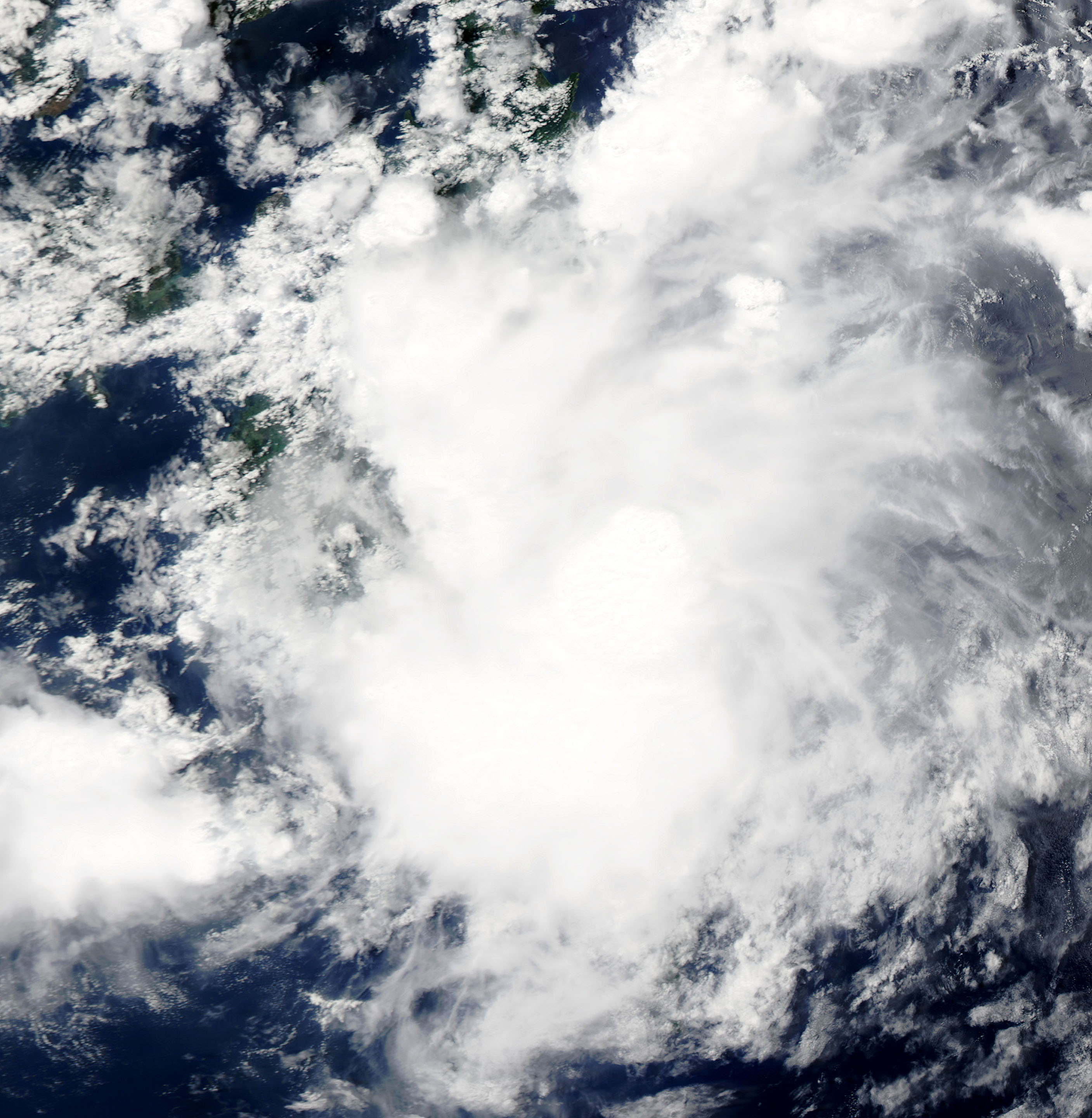
A tropical depression nearing Mindanao on April 26

On April 24, an area of low pressure had been formed about 140 km (87 mi) to the west of Palau Island. On the next day, the disturbance start to move westward. On the same time, the disturbance suddenly strengthened and its LLCC began to consolidate as well as significant banding all over the system and located over moderate vertical wind shear. Early of April 26, the disturbance rapidly strengthen again and was starting to be enhanced by a tropical upper tropospheric trough (TUTT) cell to the northeast of the system, whilst the JMA upgraded it into a tropical depression. Later that day, the depression made landfall over Davao City and Surigao del Sur boundary and crossed central Mindanao. Early on April 27, JMA downgraded the depression into an area of low pressure while it was located in vicinity of Sulu Island. In the next couple of days the low pressure start to move northwest towards South China Sea. On the same time, the low pressure crossed Palawan Island on the afternoon of April 29. On the next day, the low pressure was located about 415 km (258 mi) from Manila. In the evening of that day, the low pressure was last seen in vicinity of the Zambales area and was absorbed by a frontal system. The depression brought torrential rains to Mindanao causing slight floods in the area. No casualties were reported. When the depression reached Sulu, it was downgraded to a low-pressure system. However, it still caused heavy rains in Eastern Visayas, Southern Luzon and Manila.

Early on June 2, the JMA reported that an area of low pressure had formed over Hainan island. During the next 36 hours the low-pressure area moved to the east before late on June 3, the JMA reported that the system had intensified into a tropical depression whilst located about 600 km (370 mi) to the northwest of Manila, Philippines. Over the next couple of days, the depression moved to the northwest before the JMA stopped monitoring the system early on June 6.

Early on July 17, an area of low pressure formed about 425 nmi (787 km), southeast of Okinawa, Japan. The next day, the low pressure started to move slowly northwest. At 12:00 UTC on July 18, the JMA reported that the low pressure intensified into a minor tropical depression. On the same day, it affected Okinawa. On the next day, the depression continued to move northwest until on early of July 20, the depression was absorbed by frontal system. On that same day, the JMA issued their final advisory on the depression. Early on July 24, the JMA reported that a tropical depression had formed about 50 km (31 mi) to the east of Taipei, Taiwan. The depression was in an area of moderate vertical windshear and had a broad low level circulation. Later the next day on July 25, the depression made landfall in Yilan County before the JMA stopped monitoring the depression as it dissipated near the coast of Fujian province. Late on July 26, the JMA reported that a tropical depression had formed, within a monsoonal trough, about 400 km (250 mi) to the south of Shanghai, China. During the next day, the depression remained offshore and moved towards the north, passing about 120 km (75 mi) to the southeast of Shanghai, before weakening into an area of low pressure on July 28. During that day, the area of low pressure kept moving north, before dissipating later that day as it affected South Korea.

On August 26, the JMA reported that a tropical depression formed about 650 km (400 mi) to the southeast of Okinawa. The system was under an environment of low wind shear and enhanced upper-level diffluence associated with an anticyclone directly over the system. The system generally moved westwards, before turning northward. By August 28, the system was getting absorbed into the tail-end of a cold front. The JTWC then subsequently stopped monitoring the system. The JMA discontinued issuing advisories for the depression late on the same day. Late on August 28, the Central Pacific Hurricane Center reported that an area of low pressure, associated with a tropical disturbance, had developed about 1,000 mi (1,600 km) to the southwest of Honolulu, Hawaii. Isolated thunderstorms were developing in association with the small low-level circulation. During the next day, the disturbance moved towards the west and moved into the western Pacific, where the JMA immediately designated it as a tropical depression. The depression was expected to bring inclement weather to Majuro and nearby atolls, although the system significantly weakened before reaching the area. The depression dissipated completely very late on August 31.

The JMA had briefly monitored a weak tropical depression several miles to the east of Japan on October 7. The system dissipated the next day as it was absorbed by a stationary front. On November 3, the JMA reported that a tropical depression had developed within an area of moderate vertical windshear, about 500 km (310 mi) to the northeast of Ho Chi Minh City in Southern Vietnam. During that day the depression moved westwards as its low level circulation center gradually consolidated further, before the JTWC issued a Tropical Cyclone Formation Alert on the system. However, the system became fully exposed by the next day, prompting the JTWC to cancel the TCFA. The JMA last noted the system by November 5.

== Storm names ==
Within the North-western Pacific Ocean, both the Japan Meteorological Agency (JMA) and the Philippine Atmospheric, Geophysical and Astronomical Services Administration assign names to tropical cyclones that develop in the Western Pacific, which can result in a tropical cyclone having two names. The Japan Meteorological Agency's RSMC Tokyo — Typhoon Center assigns international names to tropical cyclones on behalf of the World Meteorological Organization's Typhoon Committee, should they be judged to have 10-minute sustained windspeeds of 65 km/h (40 mph). While the Philippine Atmospheric, Geophysical and Astronomical Services Administration assigns names to tropical cyclones which move into or form as a tropical depression in their area of responsibility located between 135°E and 115°E and between 5°N-25°N even if the cyclone has had an international name assigned to it. The names of significant tropical cyclones are retired, by both PAGASA and the Typhoon Committee. Should the list of names for the Philippine region be exhausted then names will be taken from an auxiliary list of which the first ten are published each season. Unused names are marked in gray.

=== International names ===
During the season 15 named tropical cyclones developed in the Western Pacific and 14 were named by the Japan Meteorological Agency, when it was determined that they had become tropical storms. These names were contributed to a list of a 140 names submitted by the fourteen members nations and territories of the ESCAP/WMO Typhoon Committee. The names Lionrock and Fanapi were used for the first time (and only, in the case of Fanapi), after they replaced Tingting and Rananim following the 2004 season.

Omais	Conson	Chanthu	Dianmu	Mindulle	Lionrock	Kompasu
Namtheun	Malou	Meranti	Fanapi	Malakas	Megi	Chaba

=== Other names ===
If a tropical cyclone enters the Western Pacific basin from the Eastern and Central Pacific basin (west of 180°E), it will retain the name assigned to it by the National Hurricane Center (NHC) and Central Pacific Hurricane Center (CPHC). The following storms were named in this manner.

- Omeka

=== Philippines ===
Agaton	Basyang	Caloy	Domeng	Ester
Florita	Glenda	Henry	Inday	Juan
Katring	Luis (unused)	Mario (unused)	Neneng (unused)	Ompong (unused)
Paeng (unused)	Queenie (unused)	Ruby (unused)	Seniang (unused)	Tomas (unused)
Usman (unused)	Venus (unused)	Waldo (unused)	Yayang (unused)	Zeny (unused)
Auxiliary list
Agila (unused)	Bagwis (unused)	Chito (unused)	Diego (unused)	Elena (unused)
Felino (unused)	Gunding (unused)	Harriet (unused)	Indang (unused)	Jessa (unused)

During the season PAGASA used its own naming scheme for the 11 tropical cyclones, that either developed within or moved into their self-defined area of responsibility. The names were taken from a list of names, that had been last used during 2006 and were used again during 2014. This is the same list used in the 2006 season, except for the names Mario and Ruby, which replaced Milenyo and Reming, respectively, though both names were not assigned in this season.

=== Retirement ===
During their 2011 annual session, the ESCAP/WMO Typhoon Committee announced that the name Fanapi would be retired from its naming lists and was replaced with the name Rai.

The name Juan was retired from PAGASA's list of names after causing more than Php1 billion worth of damage across the Philippines. The name Katring was also removed. Both were replaced with the names Jose and Kanor (the latter of which would be replaced by Karding) when this list was reused in 2014.

== Season effects ==
This table lists all the storms that developed in the western Pacific Ocean to the west of the International Date Line during the 2010 season. It includes their intensity, duration, name, landfalls, deaths, and damages. All damage figures are in 2010 USD. Damages and deaths from a storm include when the storm was a precursor wave or extratropical low.

Name	Dates	Peak intensity			Areas affected	Damage (USD)	Deaths	Ref(s).
Name	Dates	Category	Wind speed	Pressure	Areas affected	Damage (USD)	Deaths	Ref(s).
01W	January 18–20	Tropical Depression	55 km/h (34 mph)	1,006 hPa (29.71 inHg)	Vietnam, Cambodia	$243,000	3	
Omais (Agaton)	March 22–26	Tropical storm	65 km/h (40 mph)	998 hPa (29.47 inHg)	Woleai, Fais, Ulithi, Yap	$10,000	None	
TD	April 26	Tropical depression	Not specified	1,008 hPa (29.77 inHg)	Mindanao	None	None	
TD	June 3–5	Tropical depression	Not specified	1,002 hPa (29.59 inHg)	None	None	None	
Conson (Basyang)	July 11–18	Typhoon	120 km/h (75 mph)	975 hPa (28.79 inHg)	Philippines, South China, Vietnam	$82 million	106	
Chanthu (Caloy)	July 17–23	Typhoon	130 km/h (81 mph)	970 hPa (28.64 inHg)	Philippines, South China	$818 million	19	
TD	July 18–20	Tropical depression	55 km/h (34 mph)	1,004 hPa (29.65 inHg)	Japan	None	None	
TD	July 23–24	Tropical depression	Not specified	1,008 hPa (29.77 inHg)	Taiwan	None	None	
TD	July 26–28	Tropical depression	55 km/h (34 mph)	1,002 hPa (29.59 inHg)	Eastern China	None	None	
Domeng	August 3–5	Tropical storm	65 km/h (40 mph)	997 hPa (29.44 inHg)	Northern Luzon	None	3	
Dianmu (Ester)	August 6–12	Severe tropical storm	95 km/h (59 mph)	985 hPa (29.09 inHg)	South Korea, Japan	$42 million	37	
Mindulle	August 22–25	Tropical storm	85 km/h (53 mph)	985 hPa (29.09 inHg)	Vietnam	$43.3 million	10	
TD	August 26–28	Tropical depression	55 km/h (34 mph)	1,004 hPa (29.65 inHg)	None	None	None	
Lionrock (Florita)	August 27 – September 4	Severe tropical storm	95 km/h (59 mph)	985 hPa (29.09 inHg)	Philippines, Taiwan, South China	$65.1 million	None	
Kompasu (Glenda)	August 28 – September 2	Typhoon	150 km/h (93 mph)	960 hPa (28.35 inHg)	East China, North Korea, South Korea	$58.3 million	29	
Namtheun	August 29–31	Tropical storm	65 km/h (40 mph)	996 hPa (29.41 inHg)	Taiwan, China	None	None	
TD	August 30–31	Tropical depression	55 km/h (34 mph)	1,008 hPa (29.77 inHg)	None	None	None	
Malou (Henry)	September 1–10	Severe tropical storm	95 km/h (59 mph)	985 hPa (29.09 inHg)	Japan	Unknown	None	
Meranti	September 7–10	Severe tropical storm	100 km/h (62 mph)	985 hPa (29.09 inHg)	Taiwan, East China	$118 million	3	
Fanapi (Inday)	September 14–21	Very strong typhoon	175 km/h (109 mph)	930 hPa (27.46 inHg)	Taiwan, China	$1 billion	105	
Malakas	September 20–25	Very strong typhoon	155 km/h (96 mph)	945 hPa (27.91 inHg)	Japan	None	None	
14W	October 5–10	Tropical depression	55 km/h (34 mph)	1,006 hPa (29.71 inHg)	South China	$14.9 million	None	
TD	October 7–8	Tropical depression	Not specified	1,012 hPa (29.88 inHg)	None	None	None	
Megi (Juan)	October 12–24	Violent typhoon	230 km/h (140 mph)	885 hPa (26.13 inHg)	Philippines, Taiwan, China	$709 million	69	
17W	October 20–27	Tropical depression	55 km/h (34 mph)	1,004 hPa (29.65 inHg)	None	Unknown	None	
Chaba (Katring)	October 20–31	Very strong typhoon	175 km/h (109 mph)	930 hPa (27.46 inHg)	Japan	Minimal	None	
TD	November 3–4	Tropical depression	55 km/h (34 mph)	1,006 hPa (29.71 inHg)	Vietnam	None	None	
18W	November 12–14	Tropical depression	55 km/h (34 mph)	1,004 hPa (29.65 inHg)	Vietnam, Laos, Thailand	Unknown	None	
19W	December 12–13	Tropical depression	55 km/h (34 mph)	1,002 hPa (29.59 inHg)	Vietnam	None	None	
Omeka	December 19–20	Tropical depression	55 km/h (34 mph)	998 hPa (29.47 inHg)	None	None	None	
Season aggregates
29 systems	January 18 – December 20		230 km/h (140 mph)	885 hPa (26.13 inHg)		$2.96 billion	384	

== See also ==
- List of Pacific typhoon seasons
- 2010 Pacific hurricane season
- 2010 Atlantic hurricane season
- 2010 North Indian Ocean cyclone season
- South-West Indian Ocean cyclone seasons: 2009–10, 2010–11
- Australian region cyclone seasons: 2009–10, 2010–11
- South Pacific cyclone seasons: 2009–10, 2010–11
- Li's field - Force field theory related to Severe Tropical Storm Lionrock (Florita).
