= 2010 North Indian Ocean cyclone season =

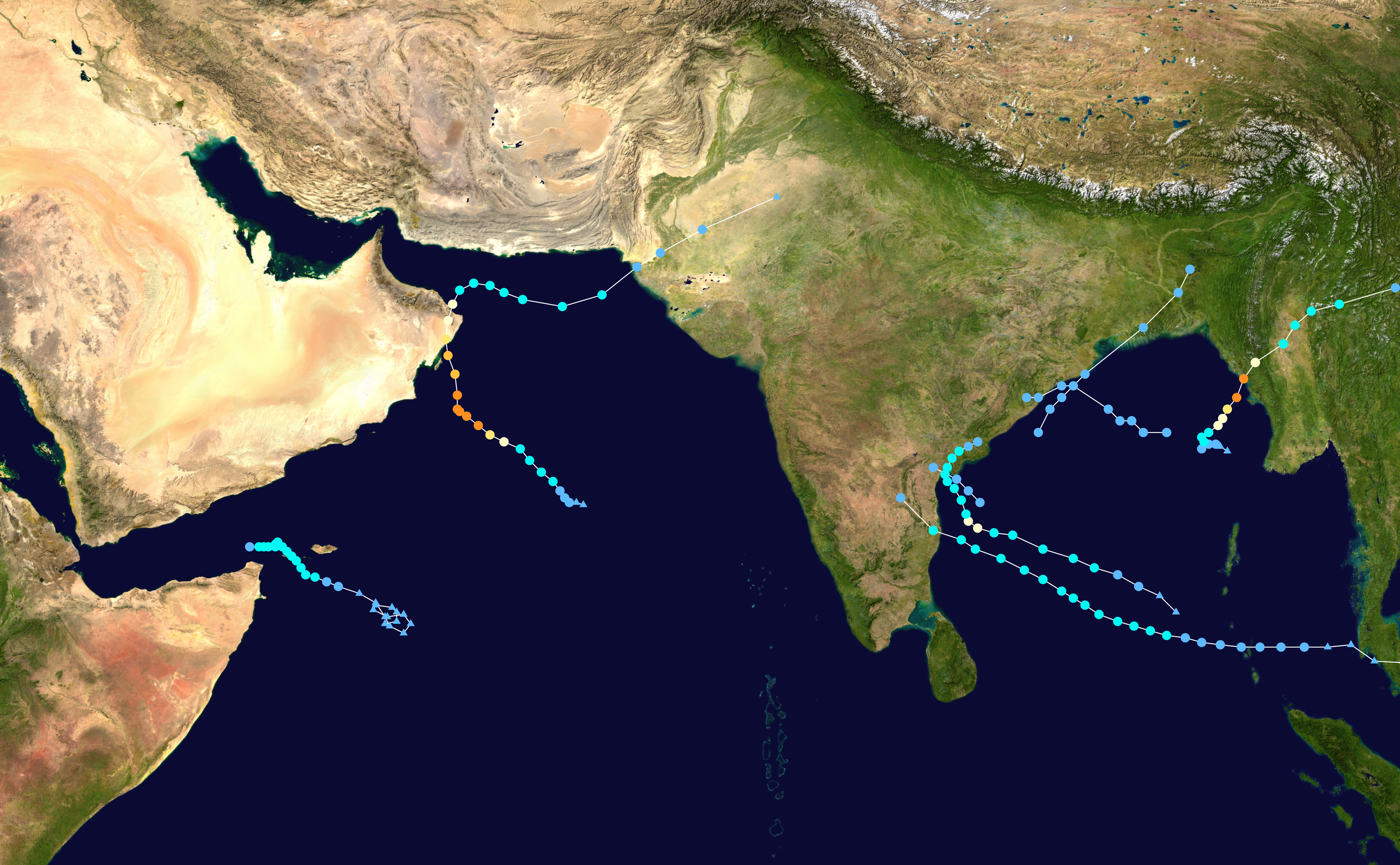
- Season summary map

Seasonal boundaries
- First system formed: May 17, 2010
- Last system dissipated: December 8, 2010

Strongest storm
- Name: Giri
  - Maximum winds: 195 km/h (120 mph) (3-minute sustained)
  - Lowest pressure: 950 hPa (mbar)

Seasonal statistics
- Depressions: 8
- Deep depressions: 6
- Cyclonic storms: 5
- Severe cyclonic storms: 4
- Very severe cyclonic storms: 2
- Extremely severe cyclonic storms: 1
- Total fatalities: 414 total
- Total damage: $3.067 billion (2010 USD)

Related articles
- 2010 Atlantic hurricane season; 2010 Pacific hurricane season; 2010 Pacific typhoon season

The 2010 North Indian Ocean cyclone season was the most active tropical cyclone season in the North Indian Ocean since 1998. The season saw 8 depressions and 5 named storms forming in the region.

The official Regional Specialized Meteorological Centre in this basin is the India Meteorological Department (IMD), while the Joint Typhoon Warning Center releases unofficial advisories to the Indian Ocean in the Northern Hemisphere, east of the Horn of Africa and west of the Malay Peninsula. There are two main seas in the North Indian Ocean — the Arabian Sea to the west of the Indian subcontinent, abbreviated ARB and the Bay of Bengal to the east, abbreviated BOB by the IMD.

== Seasonal summary ==
The season officially started on May 17, 2010, with Cyclone Laila and ended on December 8, 2010. During the season, cyclones Laila, Phet, Giri and Jal along with Bandu caused excessive life loss across the Indian subcontinent and the Middle East.

This is the only season to have five named storms since the 1998 North Indian Ocean cyclone season. Multiple storms together killed some 402 people wreaking damage worth at least US$2.985 billion. Albeit very active, no tropical storms formed between mid June and early October because of a very strong southwest monsoon, a weather anomaly that caused the 2010 Pakistan floods.

== Systems ==
=== Severe Cyclonic Storm Laila ===
- Severe cyclonic storm (IMD)
- Category 1 tropical cyclone (SSHWS)
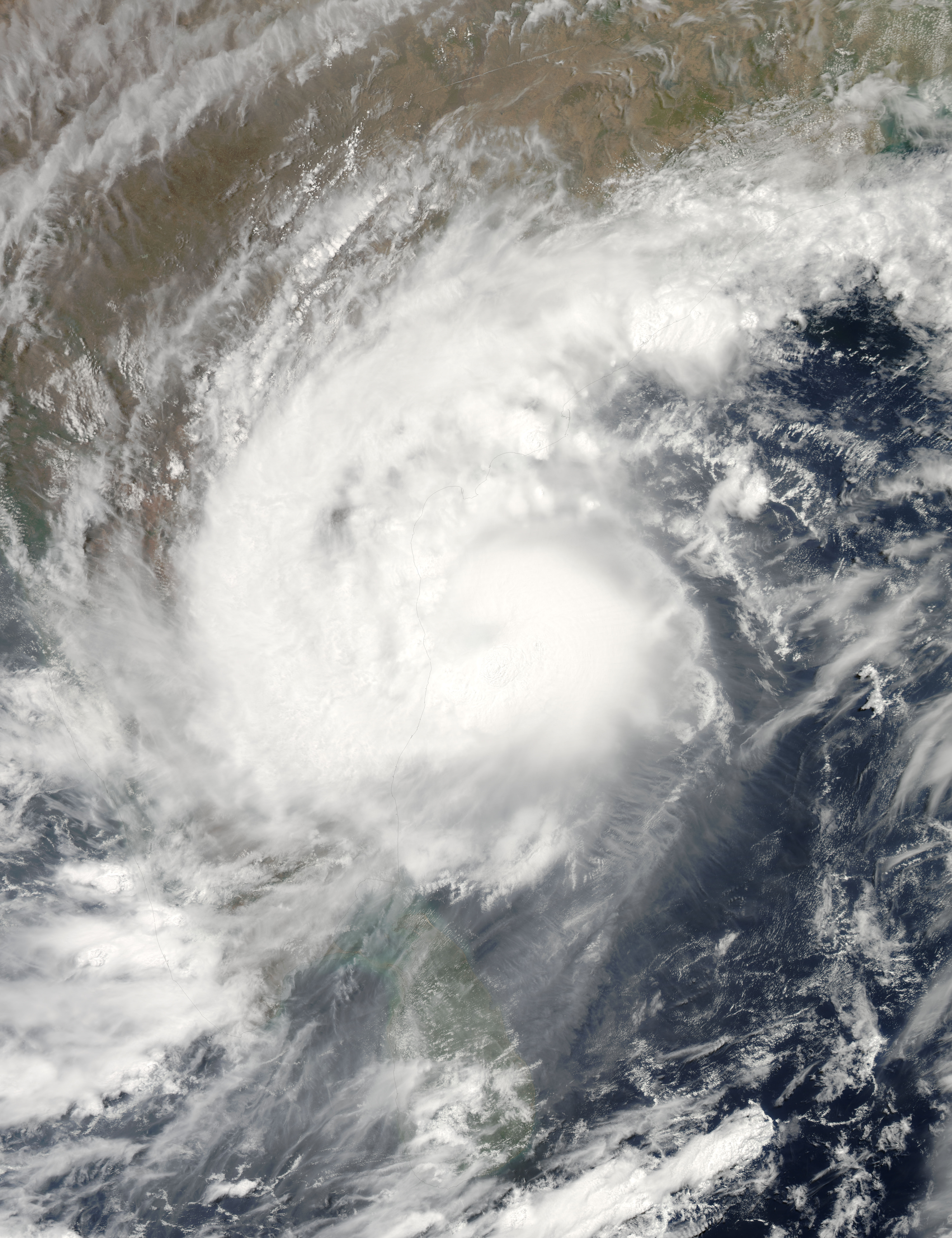
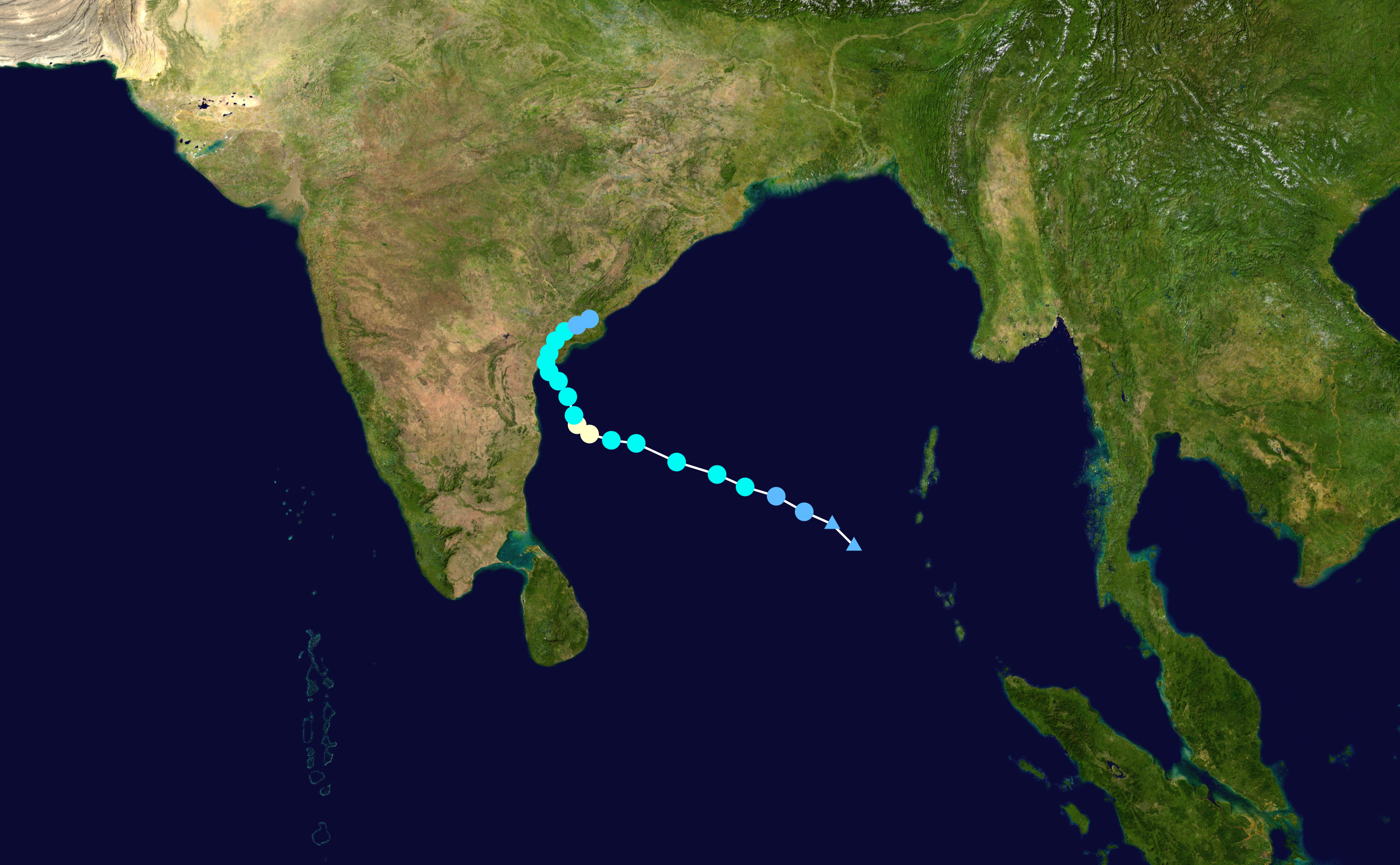
- Duration: May 17 – May 21
- Peak intensity: 100 km/h (65 mph) (3-min); 986 hPa (mbar)

On May 17, the India Meteorological Department (IMD) upgraded an area of low pressure to a depression, giving it the designation "BOB 01". At that time, the depression was located approximately 930 km (580 mi) east-southeast of Chennai, India. Later that day, the IMD upgraded Depression BOB 01 to a deep depression. That evening, the Joint Typhoon Warning Center (JTWC) designated the system as Tropical Cyclone 01B. The next morning, the deep depression strengthened further and was upgraded to a cyclonic storm and named Laila by the IMD. (Note: The name Laila (Urdu: لیلی, [lɛːlɑː]) was contributed by Pakistan and is a feminine given name meaning "night" in Urdu.) The storm continued to grow and became a severe cyclonic storm by May 19, it was given a Category 1 tropical cyclone status by the JTWC. Later the same day, it started weakening. On May 21, Laila dissipated completely.

The storm made landfall near Bapatla, Guntur district as a tropical storm between 11:00 UTC and 12:00 UTC (16:30–17:30 IST)on May 20.

=== Cyclonic Storm Bandu ===
- Cyclonic storm (IMD)
- Tropical storm (SSHWS)
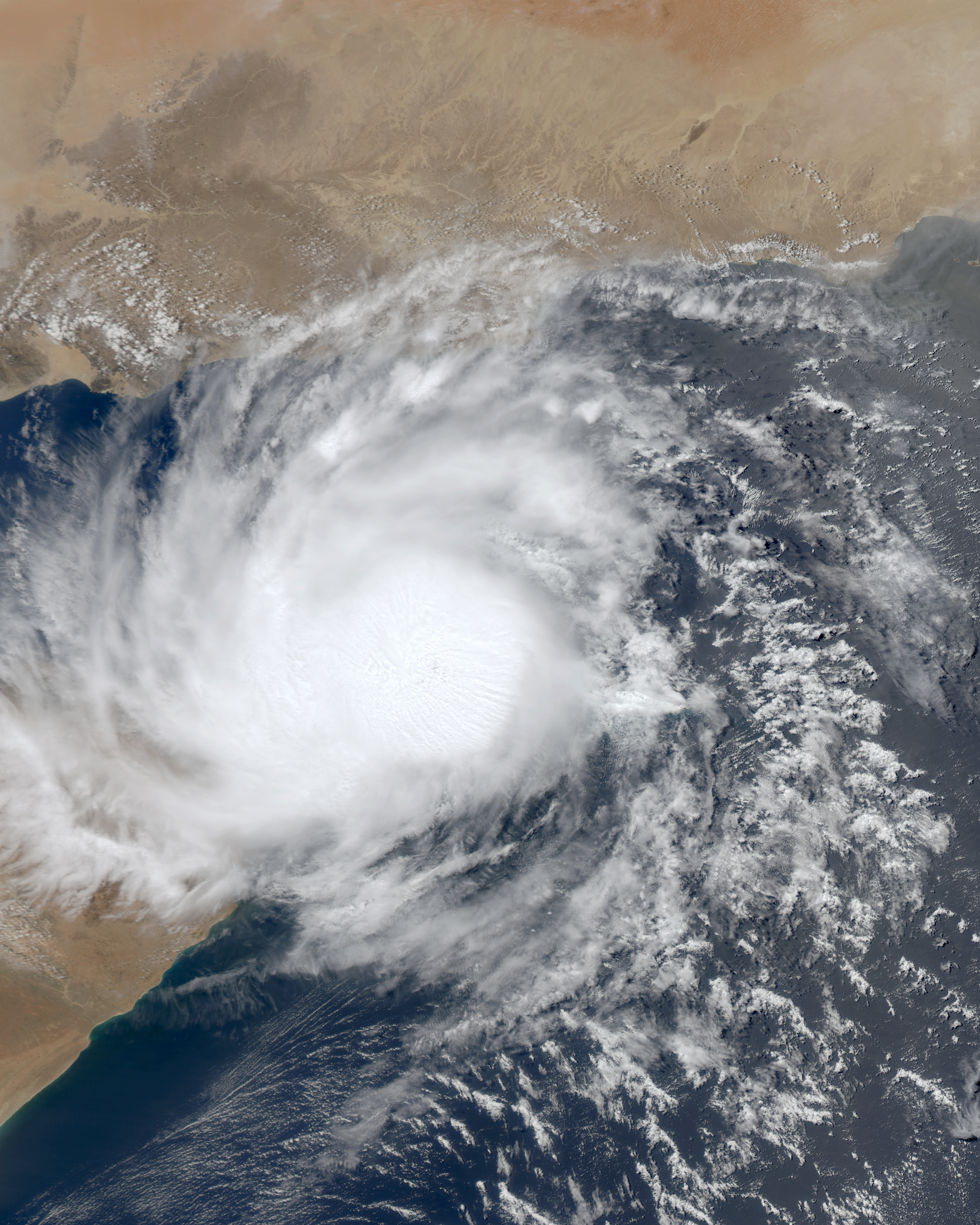
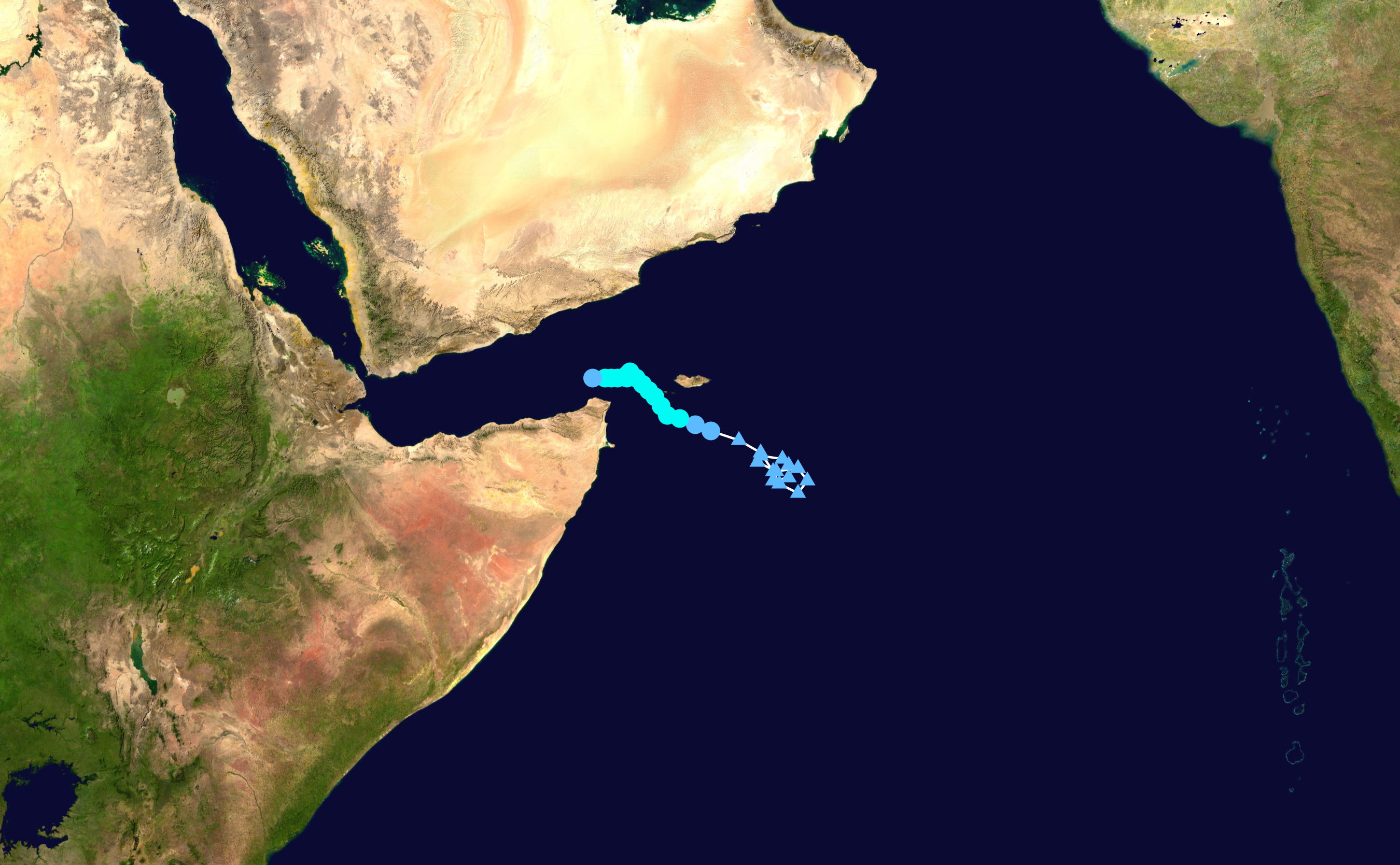
- Duration: May 19 – May 23
- Peak intensity: 75 km/h (45 mph) (3-min); 994 hPa (mbar)

On May 19, the JTWC reported that Tropical Storm 02A had formed. Later that day, the IMD upgraded the system into a depression and designated it "ARB 01". The IMD further upgraded the depression into a deep depression that same evening. Late, May 20, the IMD downgraded ARB 01 to a depression over the coast of Somalia. However, the next day it strengthened again to become Cyclonic Storm Bandu. (Note: The name Bandu (Sinhala: බන්‍ධු, [bandu]) was contributed by Sri Lanka and means "friend, kinsman" in Sinhala.) The storm then weakened and dissipated on May 23.

The island of Abd al Kuri in Yemen was hit by the storm causing the death of one girl and destruction of many houses on the island. On May 20 the storm disabled a cargo vessel, MV Dubai Moon, and left it drifting off the Somali coast. Twenty-three crew members were rescued by helicopters from the Royal Navy frigate HMS Chatham. The cargo ship later sank.

=== Very Severe Cyclonic Storm Phet ===
- Very severe cyclonic storm (IMD)
- Category 4 tropical cyclone (SSHWS)
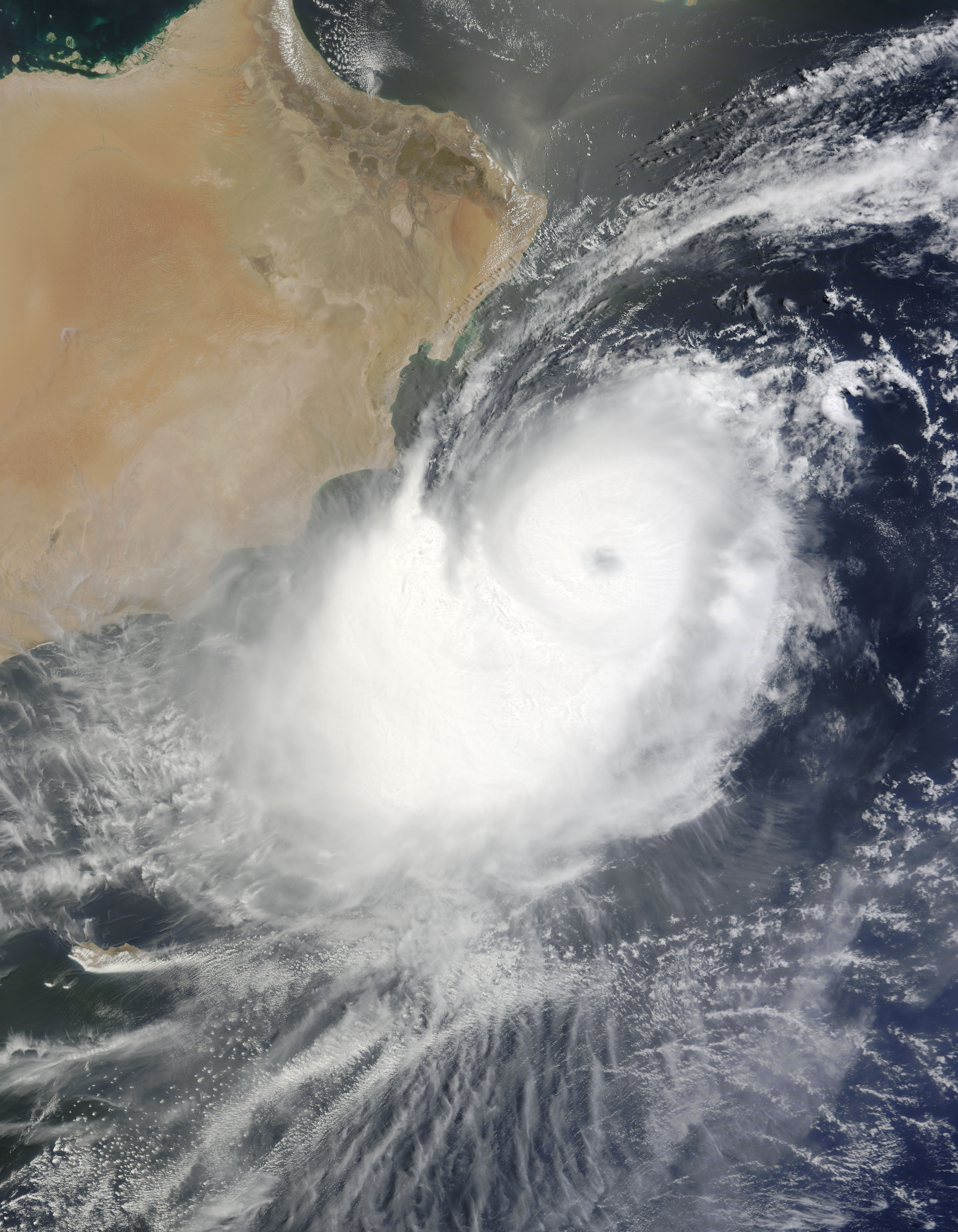
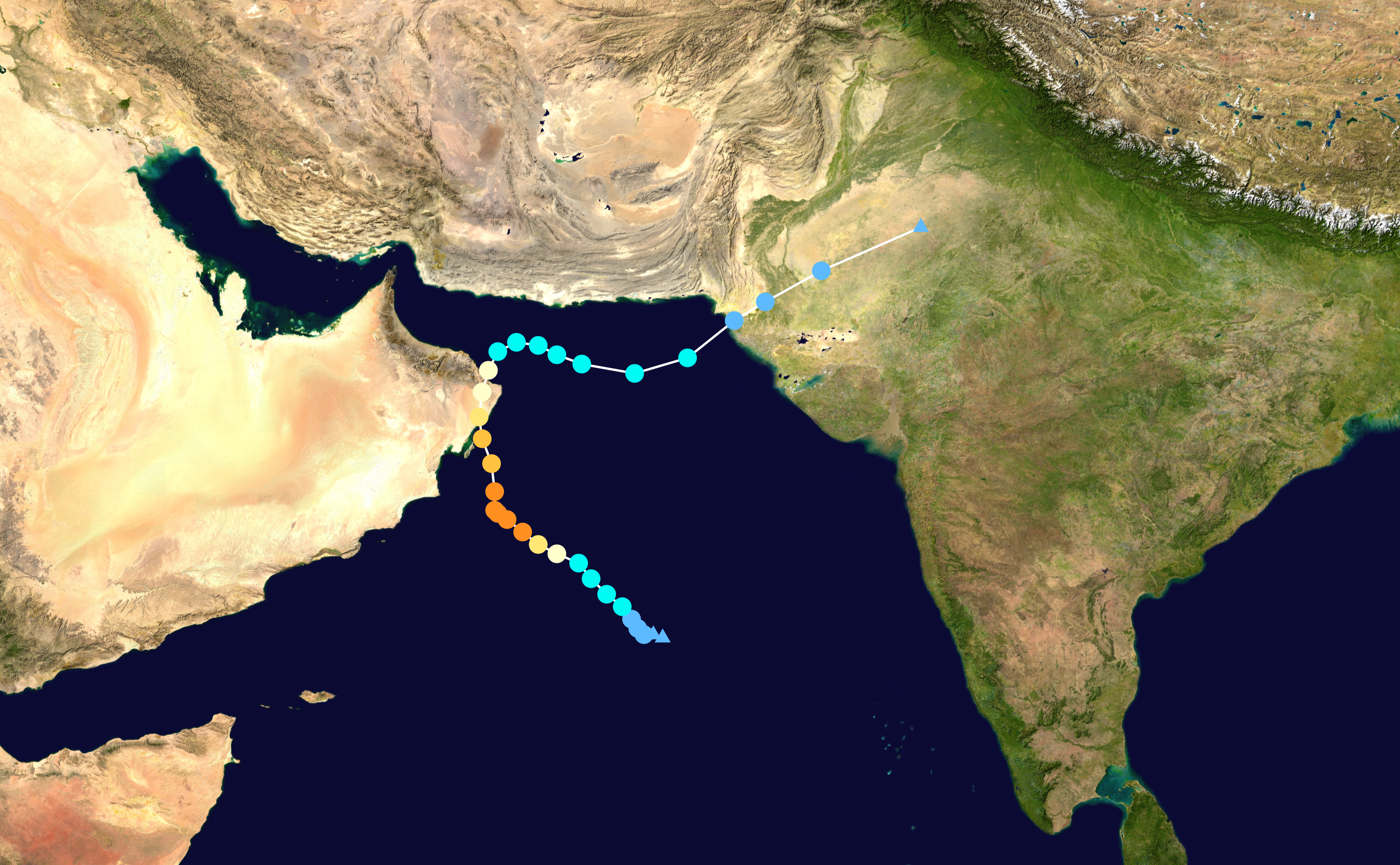
- Duration: May 30 – June 7
- Peak intensity: 155 km/h (100 mph) (3-min); 964 hPa (mbar)

Early on May 30, the India Meteorological Department (IMD) and the Joint Typhoon Warning Center (JTWC) reported that an area of low pressure had formed about 925 km (575 mi), to the southwest of Mumbai, India. The area of low pressure had loose organized convection developing around the low level circulation center within the monsoon trough. The system was located to the south of a high pressure center anchored over Oman in an area of moderate vertical windshear. On May 31, the India Meteorological Department (IMD) upgraded an area of low pressure to a depression, giving it the designation "ARB 02". The IMD further upgraded the depression into a deep depression the next day. JTWC reported the same day that a Tropical Storm had formed. On June 1, IMD upgraded the system into a cyclonic storm and named it Phet. (Note: The name Phet (Thai: เพชร, [pʰet̚˦˥]) was contributed by Thailand and means "diamond" in Thai.) The storm intensified to a Severe Cyclonic Storm in early hours of June 2. The same day IMD upgraded the storm to a Very Severe Cyclonic Storm. By the 5th, the cyclone had been downgraded to a cyclonic storm by the IMD as it passed over the Gulf of Oman. On the 7th, Phet dissipated completely.

=== Depression BOB 02 ===
- Depression (IMD)
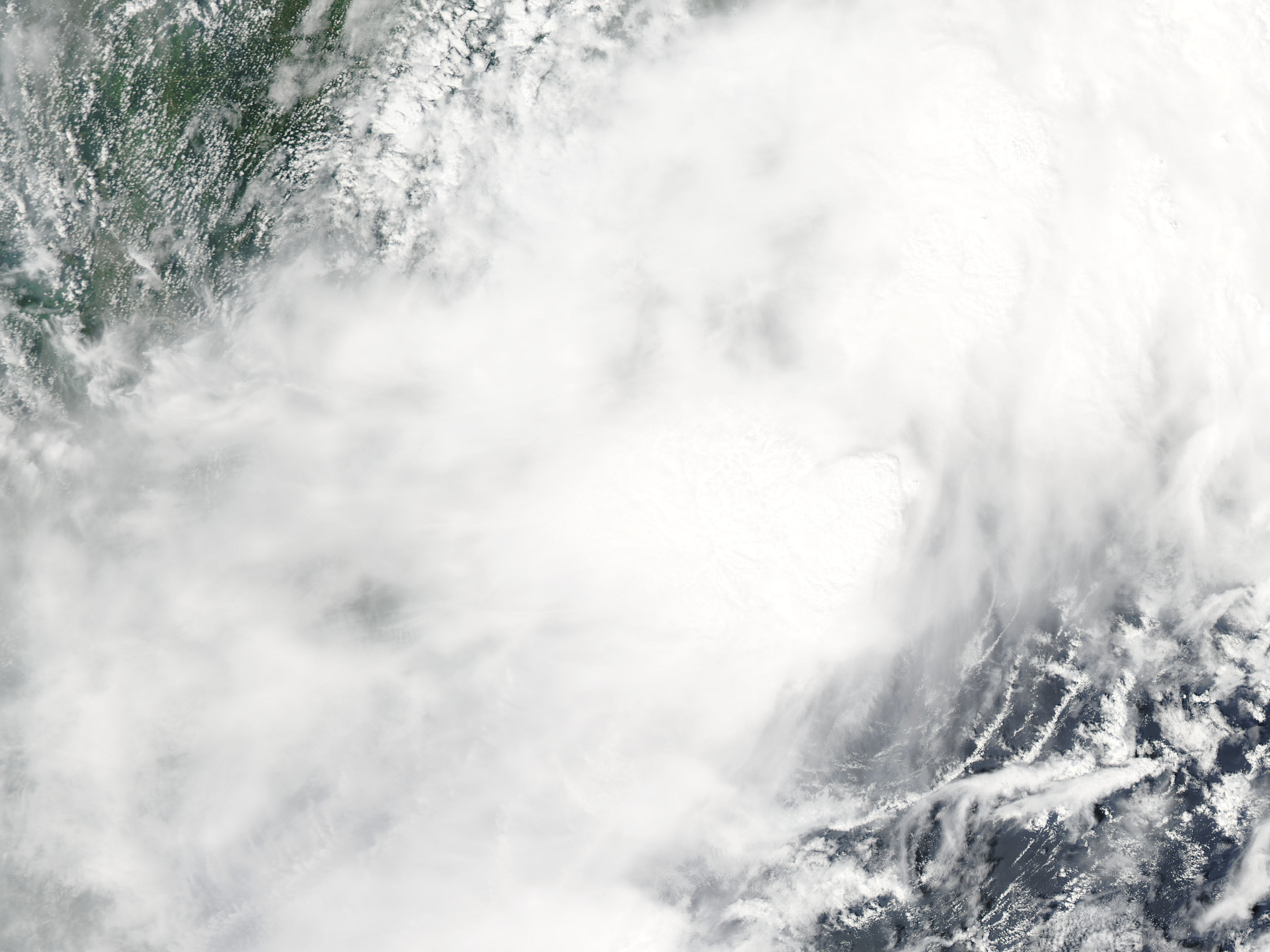
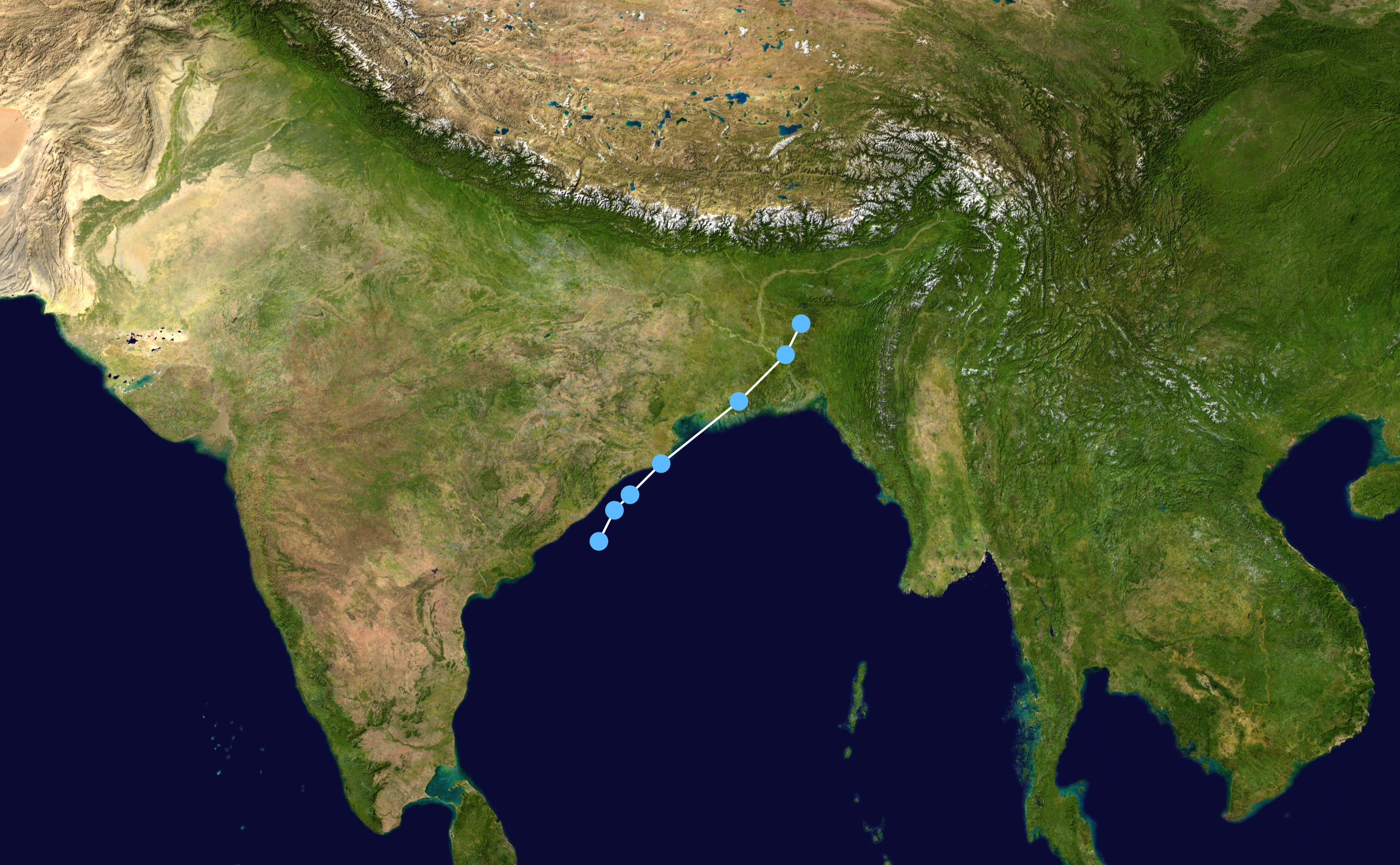
- Duration: October 7 – October 9
- Peak intensity: 45 km/h (30 mph) (3-min); 996 hPa (mbar)

On October 7, the India Meteorological Department (IMD) upgraded an area of low pressure to a depression, giving it the designation "BOB 02". At that time, the depression was located approximately 180 km (110 mi) southeast of Visakhapatnam. Later that day, the IMD reported that the system was 120 kilometres (75 mi) east of Visakhapatnam. On the same day, the IMD reported that the system moved away from Visakhapatnam and maintained strength. The system was forecast to make landfall between Gopalpur and Paradip overnight but the depression made landfall over Paradip late on October 7 instead. On October 8, the IMD reported that the system had weakened slightly. Later on that day, the IMD reported that the depression had further weakened. The storm made its second landfall at Kolkata, West Bengal, India. Signal 3 cyclone alert was issued at the Maritime ports of Chittagong, Cox's Bazar and Mongla. The Depression continued to weaken as it moved northwest until it was caught up in the jet stream and completely absorbed by a non-tropical storm early on October 9.

11 people were killed in the submerged coastal areas of Bangladesh on the day when the storm made landfall. Tens of thousands of people were stranded as flooding triggered by the storm surge inundated thousands of homes in the low-lying coastal zone. The heavy rain took the toll further to 17.

=== Deep Depression BOB 03 ===
- Deep depression (IMD)
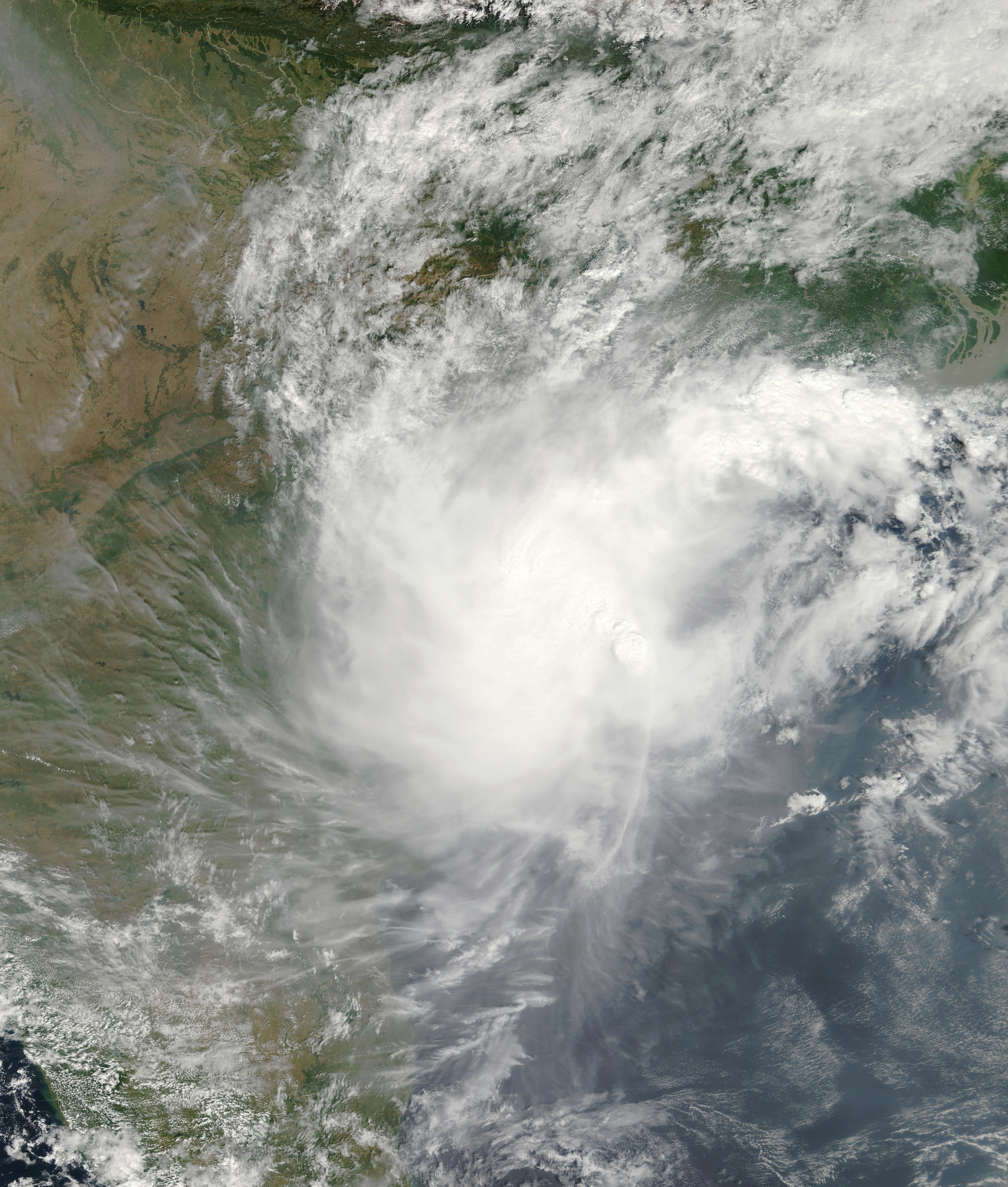
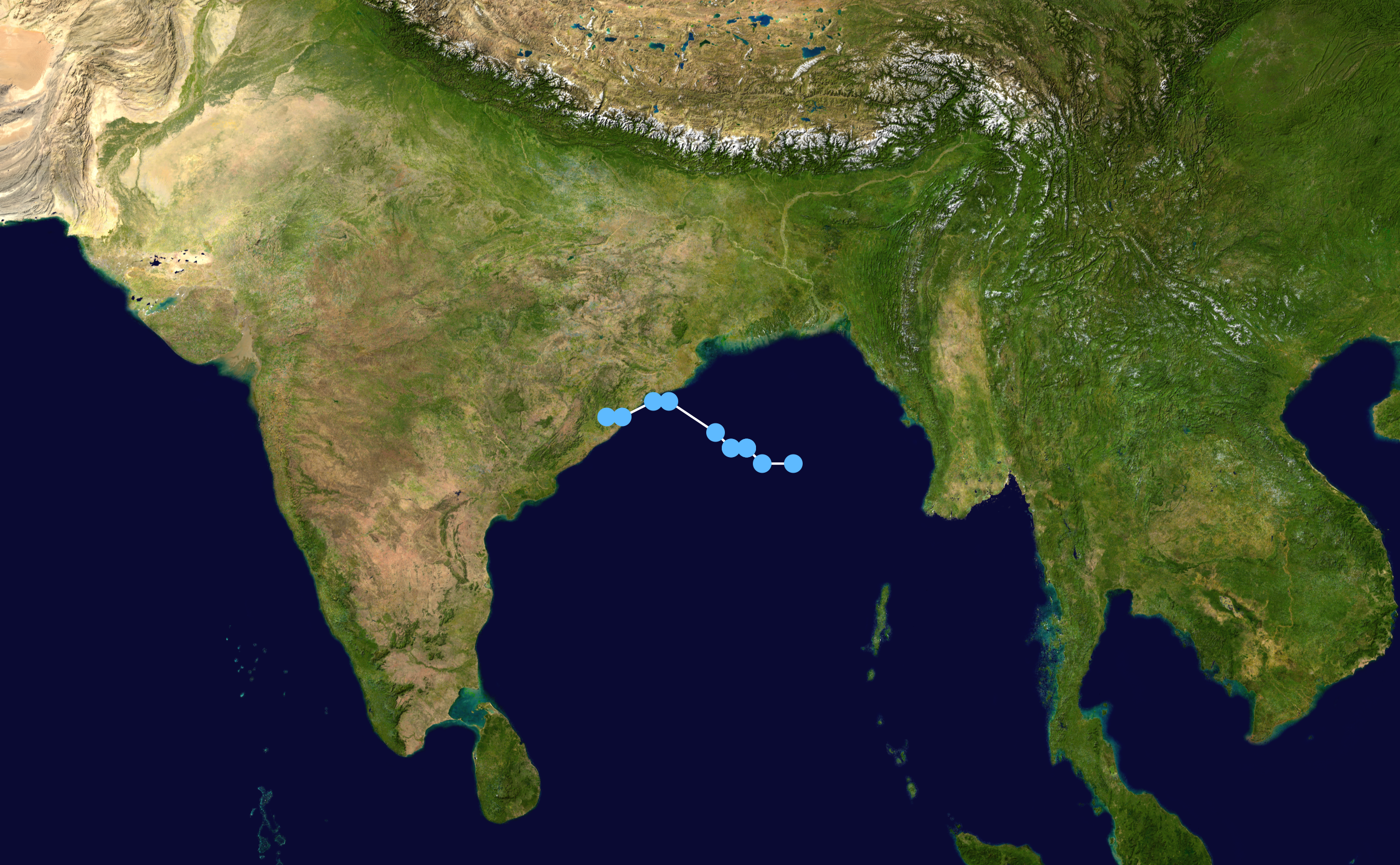
- Duration: October 13 – October 16
- Peak intensity: 55 km/h (35 mph) (3-min); 995 hPa (mbar)

On October 13, the India Meteorological Department (IMD) upgraded an area of low pressure to a depression, giving it the designation "BOB 03". At that time, the depression was located approximately 700 kilometres (430 mi) east of Visakhapatnam. Late on that day, the IMD reported that the system had further intensified. The IMD upgraded the depression into a deep depression on October 15. The system was forecast to make landfall between Gopalpur and Paradip near Puri late on that day. Instead, it made landfall very close to Gopalpur. Early on October 16, BOB 03 started weakening. Later on that day, the depression degenerated into a remnant low. The remnants continued to weaken until it dissipated completely that day.

=== Extremely Severe Cyclonic Storm Giri ===
- Extremely severe cyclonic storm (IMD)
- Category 4 tropical cyclone (SSHWS)
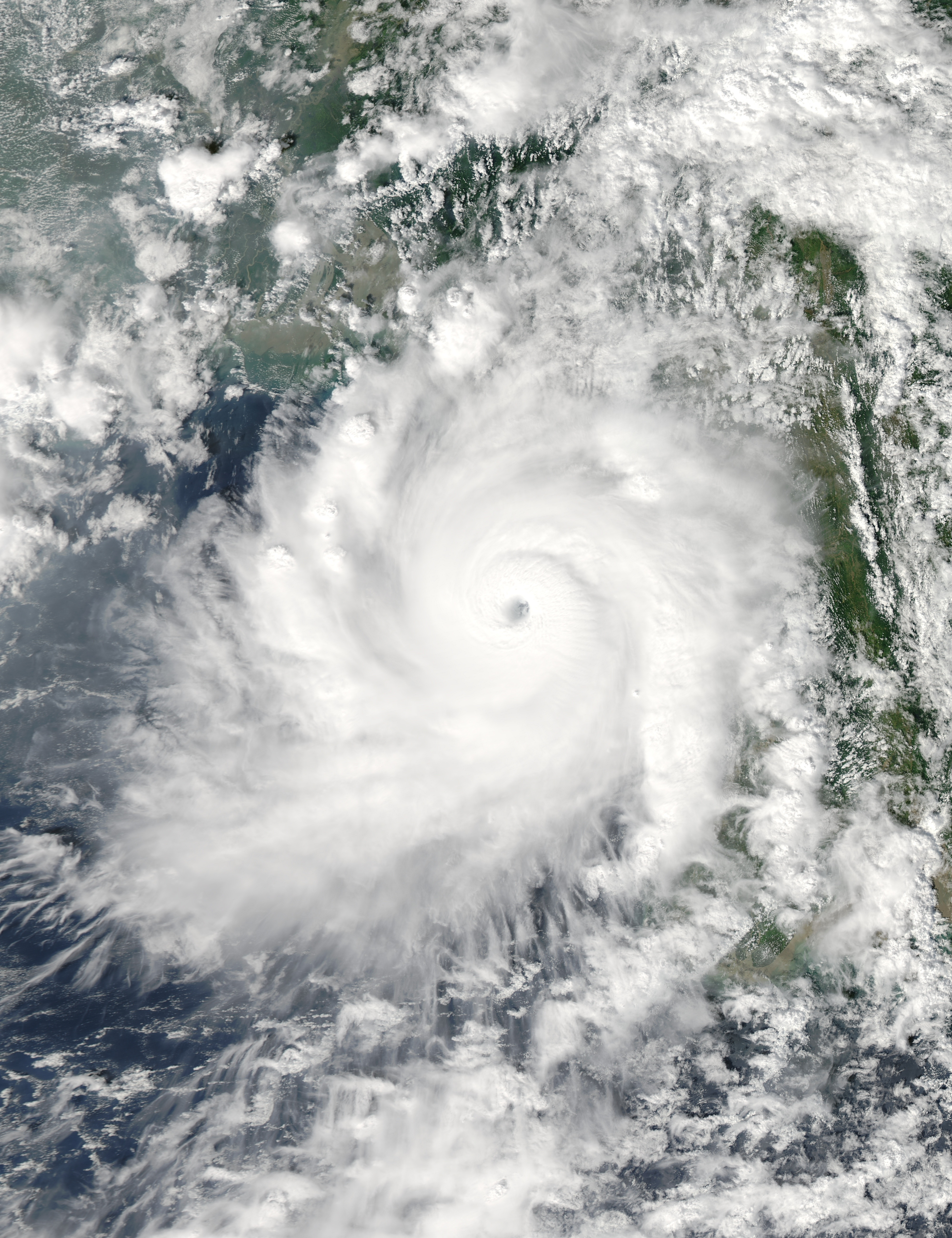
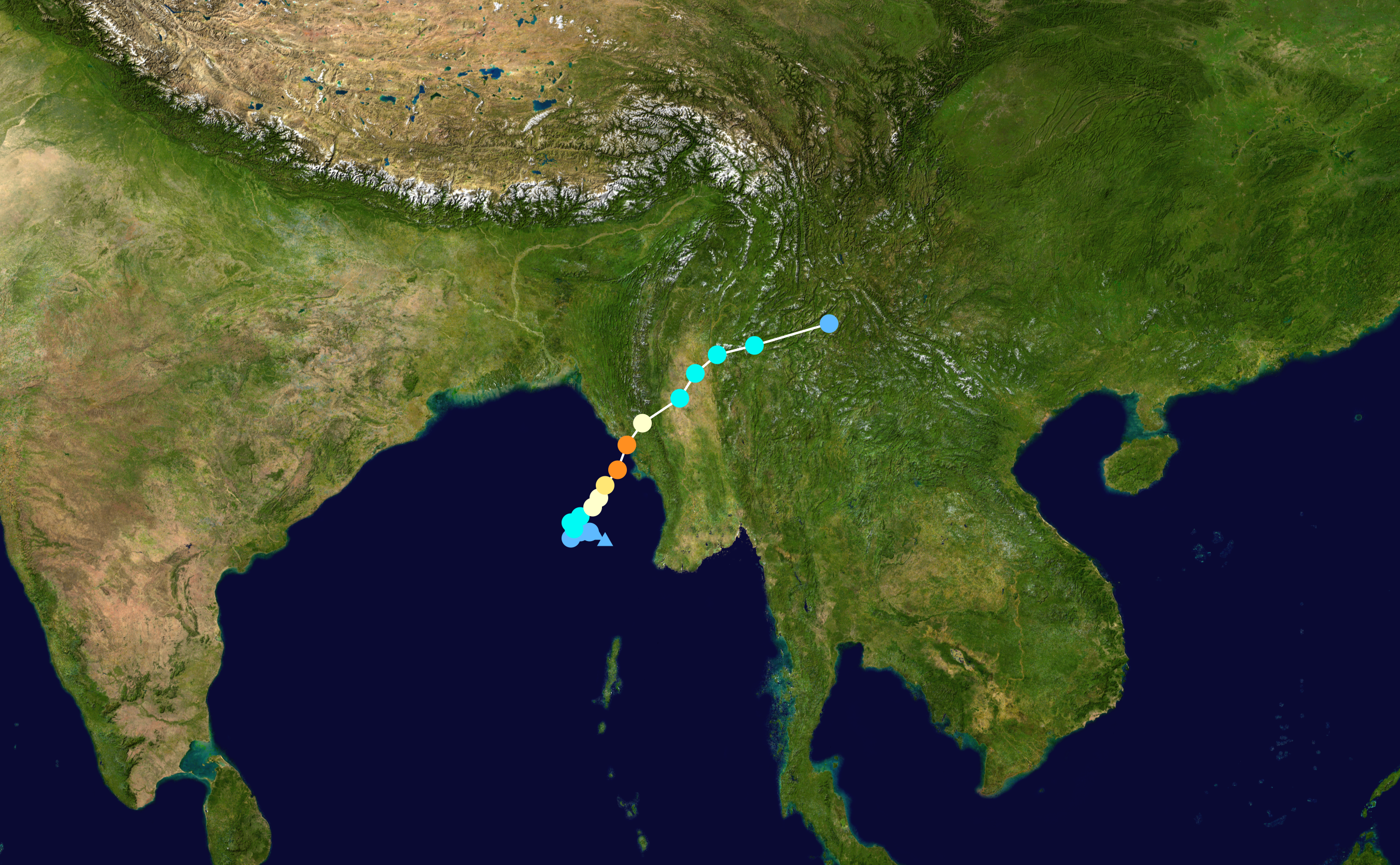
- Duration: October 20 – October 23
- Peak intensity: 195 km/h (120 mph) (3-min); 950 hPa (mbar)

On October 19, an area of low pressure formed in the Bay of Bengal. During the next day, the India Meteorological Department (IMD) upgraded the area of low pressure to a depression giving it the designation "BOB 04". At that time it was located approximately 250 kilometres (160 mi) southwest of Sittwe, Myanmar. Early on October 21, the IMD upgraded Depression BOB 04 to a deep depression. That day, the Joint Typhoon Warning Center (JTWC) designated the system as Tropical Cyclone 04B. Later, the deep depression strengthened further and was upgraded to a cyclonic storm and named Giri by the IMD. (Note: The name Giri (Bengali: গিরি, [giɾiˑ]) was contributed by Bangladesh and means "mountain" in Bengali.) Early on October 22, the IMD upgraded the storm to a Very Severe Cyclonic Storm. The cyclone had intensified to a Category 4 tropical cyclone on the SSHS according to the JTWC. Late on the same day, the IMD reported that the system had grown stronger than Cyclone Phet, becoming the most powerful storm of the season. According to the news, the cyclone made landfall late on October 22, at Kyaukphyu, Arakan, Myanmar. Late on October 22, Giri weakened into a Severe Cyclonic Storm. Early on October 23, Giri further weakened into a Cyclonic Storm. Later the same day, Giri continued to weaken and became a depression. The depression continued to weaken until it decayed into a remnant low late on October 23. Early on October 24, the remnants of Giri were completely absorbed by a non-tropical low near the Himalayas.

=== Severe Cyclonic Storm Jal ===
- Severe cyclonic storm (IMD)
- Tropical storm (SSHWS)
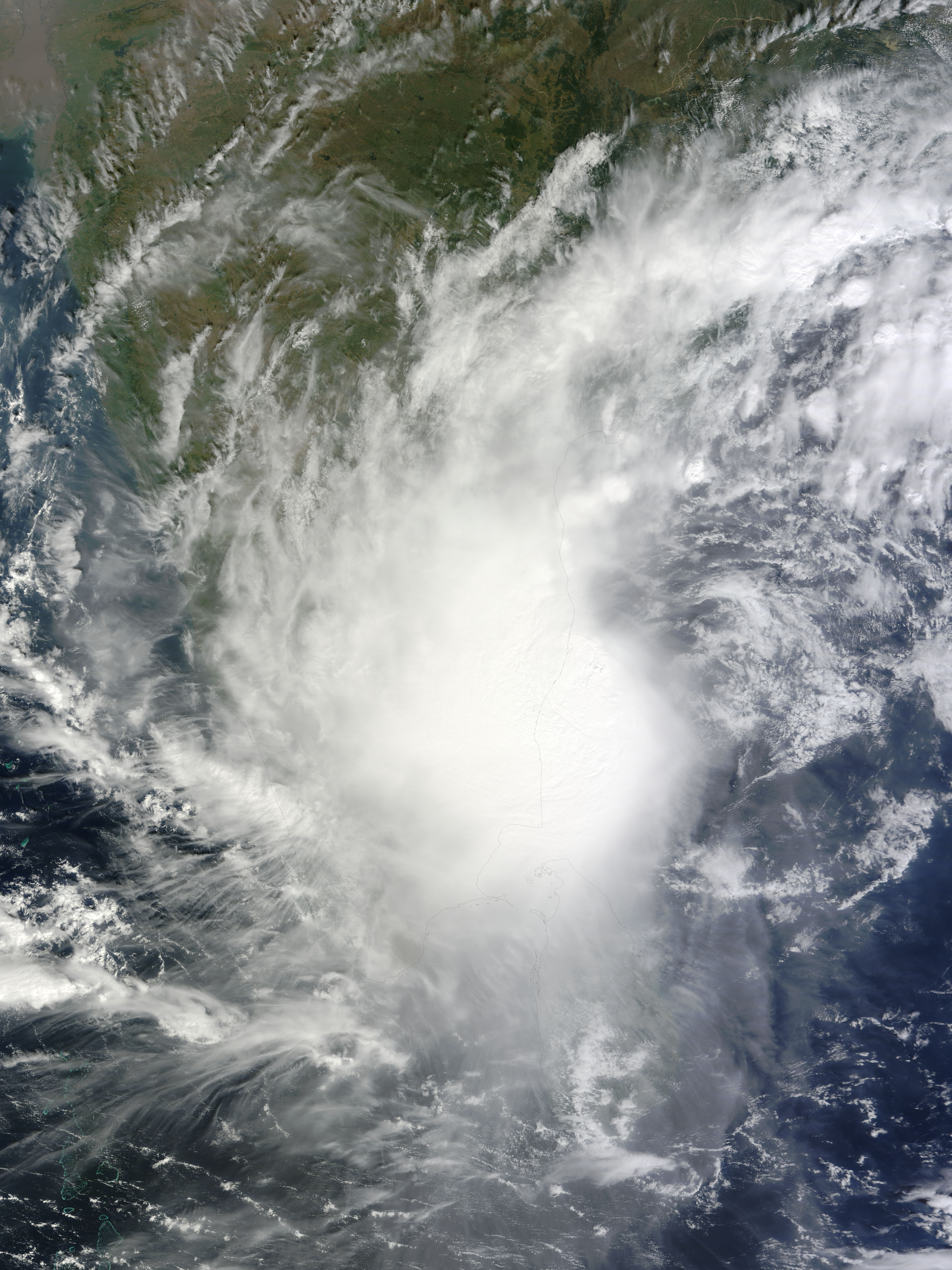
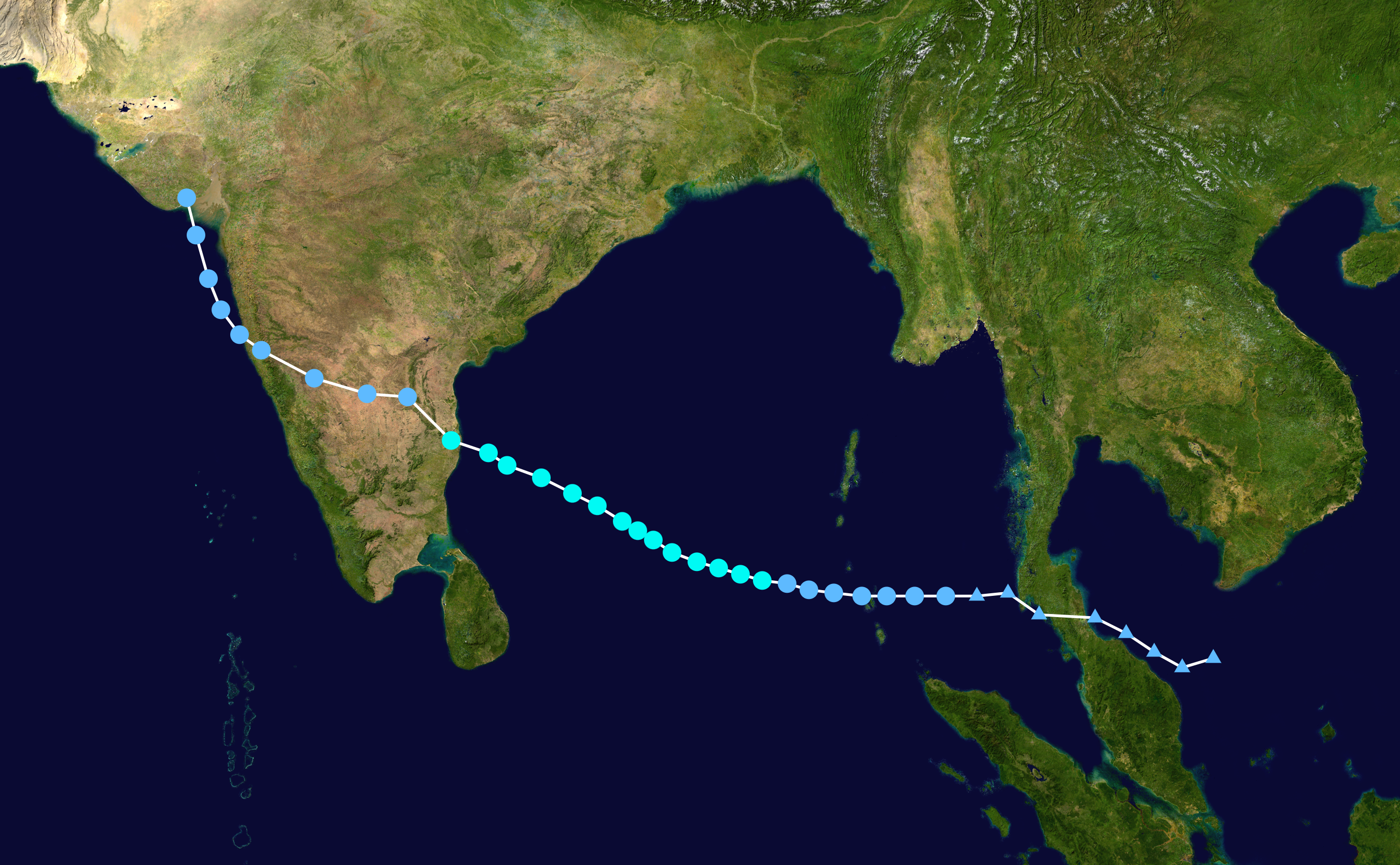
- Duration: November 1 – November 8
- Peak intensity: 110 km/h (70 mph) (3-min); 988 hPa (mbar)

On October 12, a disturbance formed in the South China Sea, just off the eastern coast of Borneo. During the next few days, the system entered the border of the east Indian Ocean and intensified slightly. As soon as the system entered the eastern border of the Bay of Bengal on November 1, the IMD immediately upgraded the disturbance into a depression, because the system had already organized itself on October 31, a day before the system entered the IMD's area of responsibility. Later on November 1, the system began showing signs of further, but slow organization, as it continued moving west slowly. on November 2, the Malaysian Meteorological Department (MMD) also issued their first advisory on the system, and simply called it Depression. Later on that day, the IMD reported that the system had weakened into a low-pressure area, but they forecasted it to intensify into a depression soon again. Late on November 3, the Joint Typhoon Warning Center (JTWC) issued a Tropical Cyclone Formation Alert on the system. Early on November 4, the India Meteorological Department (IMD) upgraded the area of low pressure to a depression giving it the designation "BOB 05". That day, the Joint Typhoon Warning Center (JTWC) designated the system as Tropical Cyclone 05B. Early on November 5, the IMD upgraded Depression BOB 05 to a deep depression. Later, the deep depression strengthened further, prompting the IMD to upgrade it to a cyclonic storm, and was named Jal. (Note: The name Jal (Hindi: जल, [d͡ʒɐl]) was contributed by India and means "water" in Hindi.) The storm continued to grow and became a severe cyclonic storm by November 6. Soon afterwards, it was upgraded to a Category 1 Tropical Cyclone by the JTWC. On November 7, Jal started weakening. Soon afterwards, the IMD reported that Jal weakened into a Cyclonic Storm. Later that day, the JTWC downgraded Jal into a Tropical storm. Late on the same day, the IMD reported that the storm weakened into a Deep Depression. As a deep depression, the system made landfall at Chennai, a few hours later. The system continued to weaken and became a depression by early hours of November 8. The depression continued to weaken until it dissipated into a remnant low on the same day. On that very same day the IMD said that there was a possibility of Jal's remnants regenerating over the north east Arabian Sea. As predicted, the system moved into the Arabian Sea without weakening by early November 9. However, instead of crossing the Arabian Sea, the system moved north along the western coast of India, restrengthening slightly, but not enough for it to regenerate completely. Within a few hours, the storm started moving inland, due to the prevailing winds. The system rapidly weakened as it moved farther inland over the next few days, causing severe flooding along the way. Early on November 12, the remnants of Cyclone Jal were completely absorbed by a non-tropical low over the Himalayas.

=== Depression BOB 06 ===
- Depression (IMD)
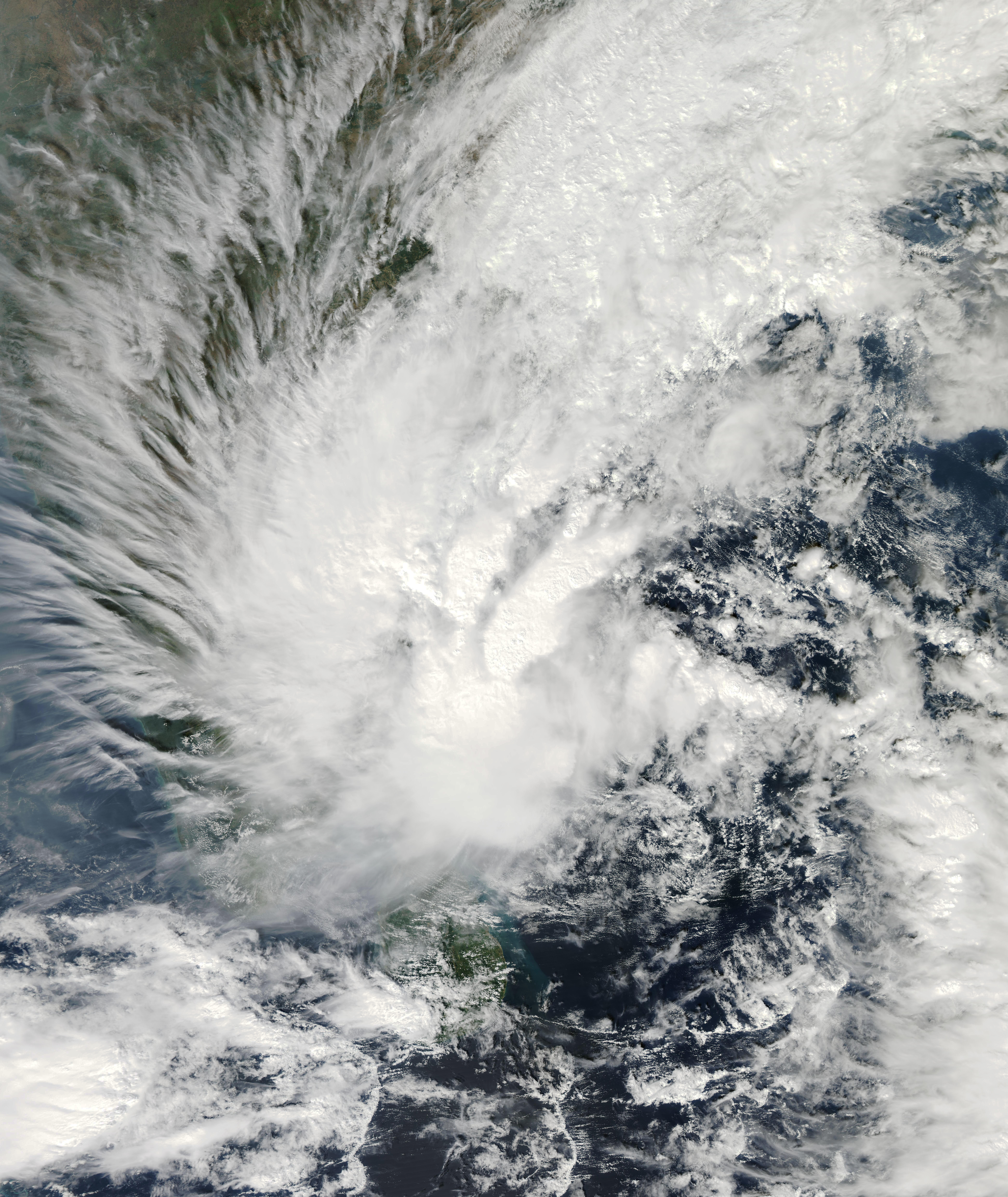
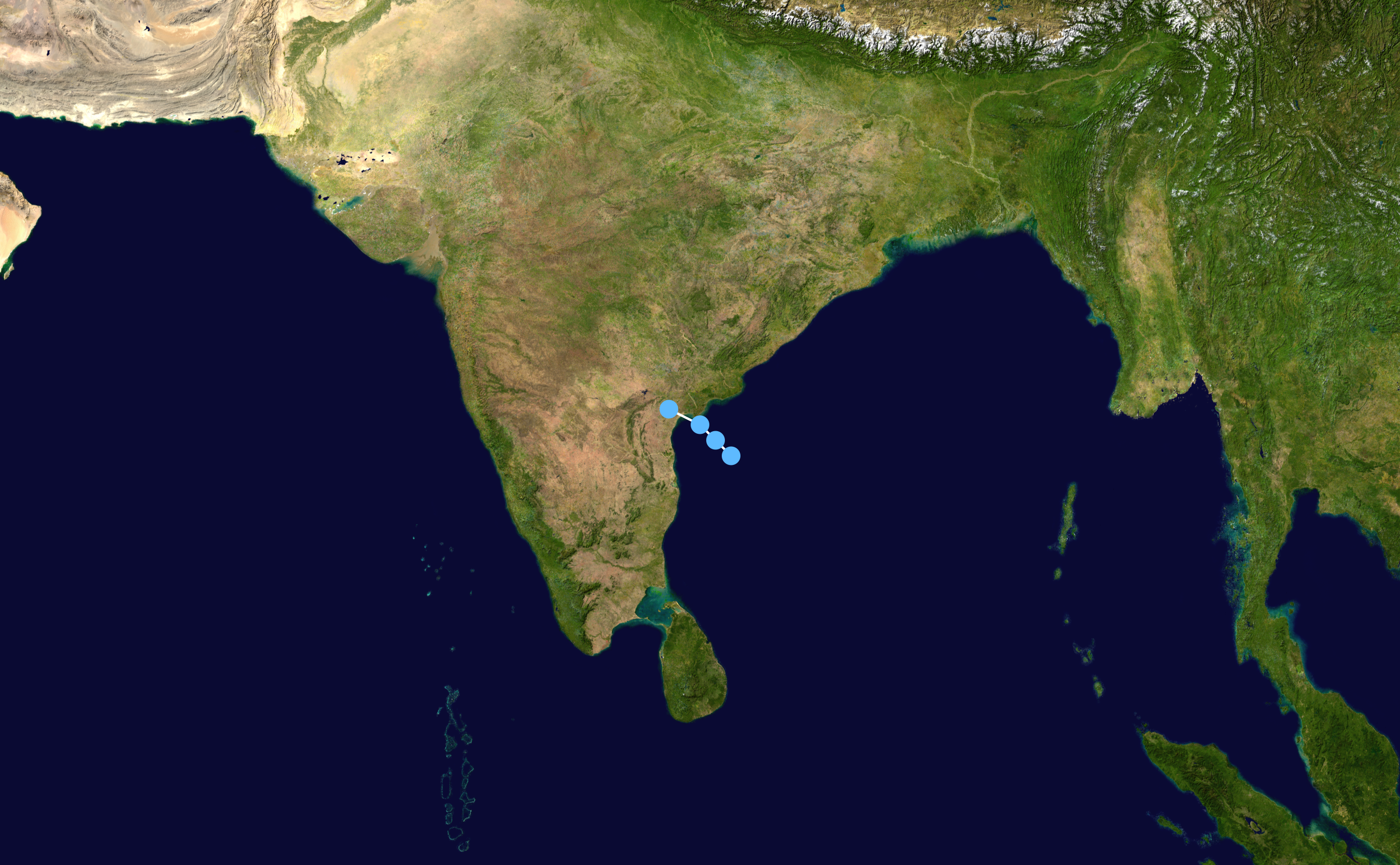
- Duration: December 7 – December 8
- Peak intensity: 45 km/h (30 mph) (3-min); 1000 hPa (mbar)

In early December, a low-pressure area formed over the Bay of Bengal. The low-pressure area moved towards the Indian coast and became more well marked. On December 7, the India Meteorological Department (IMD) upgraded the area of low pressure to a depression giving it the designation "BOB 06". At that time it was located approximately 450 kilometres (280 mi) south-southwest of Visakhapatnam, Andhra Pradesh, India. Until December 8, the depression moved northwestwards and made landfall at Bapatla, Andhra Pradesh, India where it dissipated into a remnant low soon after the landfall.

== Season effects ==
This is a table of all storms in the 2010 North Indian Ocean cyclone season. It mentions all of the season's storms and their names, duration, peak intensities (according to the IMD storm scale), damage, and death totals. Damage and death totals include the damage and deaths caused when that storm was a precursor wave or extratropical low, and all of the damage figures are in 2010 USD.

Name	Dates	Peak intensity			Areas affected	Damage (USD)	Deaths	Ref(s).
Name	Dates	Category	Wind speed	Pressure	Areas affected	Damage (USD)	Deaths	Ref(s).
Laila	May 17–21	Severe cyclonic Storm	100 km/h (60 mph)	986 hPa (29.12 inHg)	Sri Lanka, India	$117 million	65	
Bandu	May 19–23	Cyclonic storm	75 km/h (45 mph)	994 hPa (29.35 inHg)	Somalia, Yemen	None	1	
Phet	May 31 – June 7	Very severe cyclonic storm	155 km/h (95 mph)	970 hPa (28.64 inHg)	Oman, Pakistan, India	$861 million	47	
BOB 02	October 7–9	Depression	45 km/h (30 mph)	996 hPa (29.41 inHg)	India, Bangladesh	Minimal	17	
BOB 03	October 13–16	Deep depression	65 km/h (40 mph)	995 hPa (29.38 inHg)	India	Minimal	None	
Giri	October 20–23	Extremely severe cyclonic storm	195 km/h (120 mph)	950 hPa (28.05 inHg)	Bangladesh, Myanmar, Thailand, Yunnan	$359 million	167	
Jal	November 1–8	Severe Cyclonic storm	110 km/h (70 mph)	988 hPa (29.18 inHg)	Thailand, Malaysia, Andaman Islands, India	$1.73 billion	117	
BOB 06	December 7–8	Depression	45 km/h (30 mph)	1,000 hPa (29.53 inHg)	India	Minimal	None	
Season aggregates
8 systems	May 17 – December 8		195 km/h (120 mph)	950 hPa (28.05 inHg)		$3.07 billion	414	

== See also ==
- List of North Indian cyclone seasons
- 2010 Atlantic hurricane season
- 2010 Pacific hurricane season
- 2010 Pacific typhoon season
- South-West Indian Ocean cyclone seasons: 2009–10 2010–11
- Australian region cyclone seasons: 2009–10 2010–11
- South Pacific cyclone seasons: 2009–10 2010–11
- South Atlantic tropical cyclone
