= Cyclone Giri =

North Indian cyclone in 2010

Extremely Severe Cyclonic Storm Giri
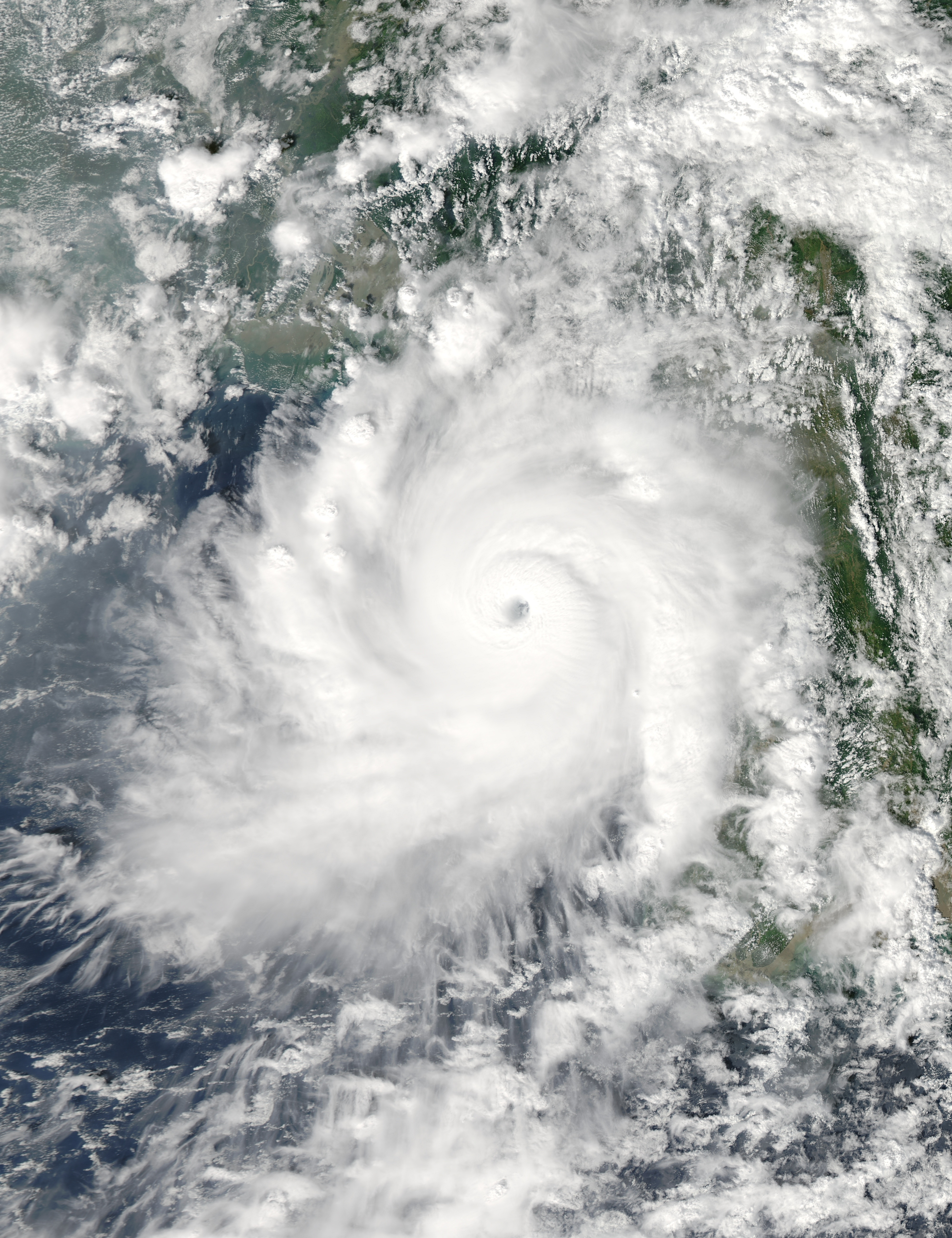
- Cyclone Giri near peak intensity on October 22

Meteorological history
- Formed: October 20, 2010
- Dissipated: October 23, 2010

Extremely severe cyclonic storm
- 3-minute sustained (IMD)
- Highest winds: 195 km/h (120 mph)
- Lowest pressure: 950 hPa (mbar); 28.05 inHg

Category 4-equivalent tropical cyclone
- 1-minute sustained (SSHWS/JTWC)
- Highest winds: 250 km/h (155 mph)
- Lowest pressure: 922 hPa (mbar); 27.23 inHg

Overall effects
- Fatalities: 157 direct, 10 indirect
- Damage: $359 million (2010 USD)
- Areas affected: Myanmar, Bangladesh, Thailand, Yunnan
- IBTrACS
- Part of the 2010 North Indian Ocean cyclone season

Extremely Severe Cyclonic Storm Giri (Note: The name Giri (Bengali: গিরি; [giɾiˑ]) was contributed by Bangladesh and means "mountain" in Bengali.) (IMD designation: BOB 04, JTWC designation 04B, also known as Cyclone Giri) was a powerful tropical cyclone in terms of 1-minute sustained wind speed which caused catastrophic damage in parts of Myanmar in late October 2010. Originating from an area of low pressure over the Bay of Bengal on October 19, the system began as a weak depression 250 km (155 mi) south of Myanmar. Over the following few days, the depression underwent explosive intensification, reaching its peak intensity with winds of 195 km/h (120 mph 3-minute sustained) on October 22. Cyclone Giri made landfall roughly 50 km (31 mi) northwest of Kyaukpyu, shortly after peaking. Within hours of moving onshore, the system had substantially weakened. By the following day, Giri had degenerated into a tropical depression and the final advisory was issued on the storm.

Unlike during Cyclone Nargis in 2008, the Government of Myanmar took steps to ensure the safety of residents in the path of Cyclone Giri. An estimated 53,000 are believed to have evacuated Kyaukphyu before the arrival of the storm. Throughout central Myanmar, at least 157 people are known to have been killed by Giri. Thousands of structures near where the storm made landfall were destroyed, leaving more than 70,000 people homeless. An international relief effort began shortly after the storm passed to assist survivors of the storm. Local and foreign media initially criticized the Myanmar government for not giving residents enough warning of the storm and then for keeping quiet on the situation, but the focus later shifted to the loss of life and relief efforts.

== Meteorological history ==
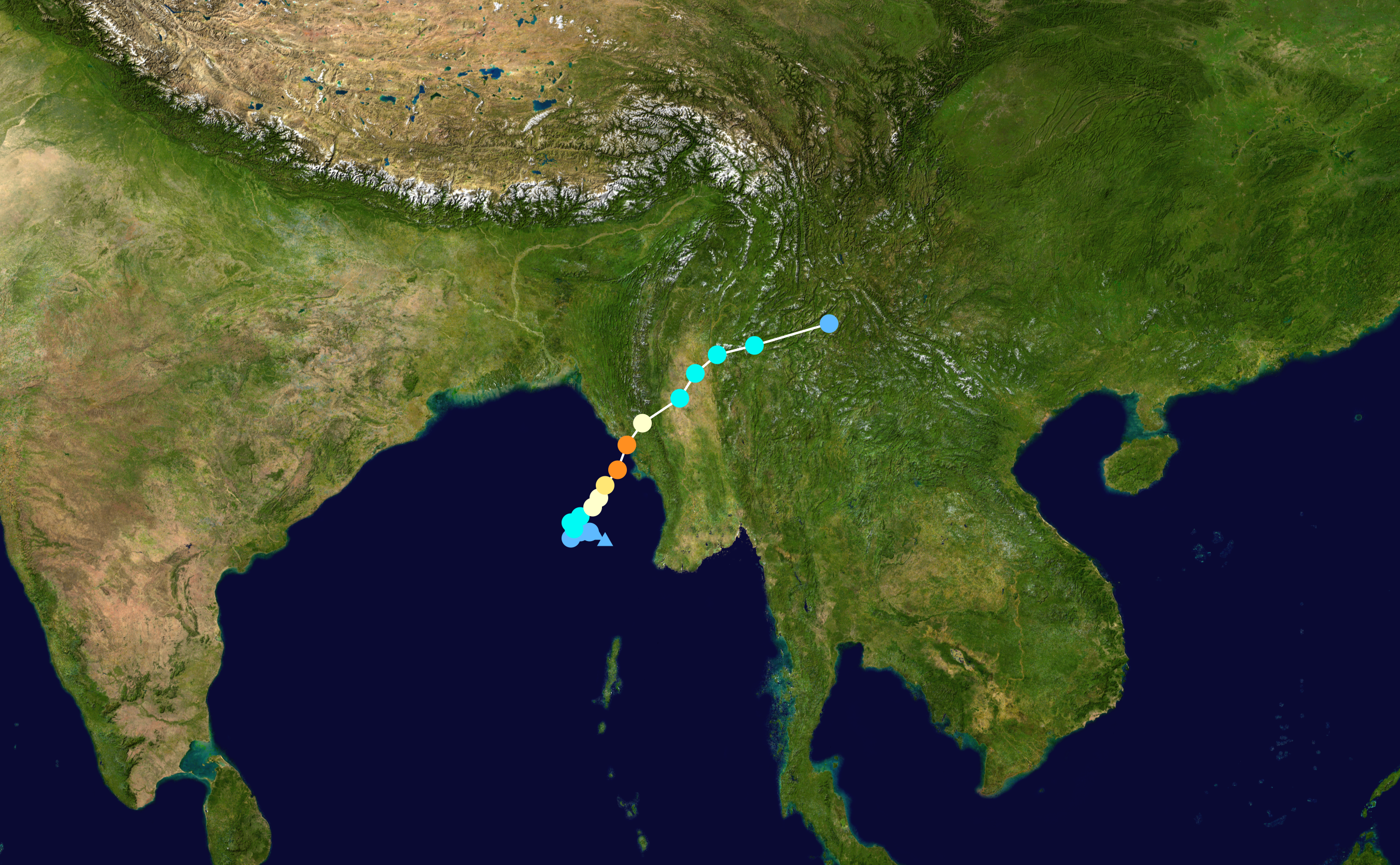
Map plotting the storm's track and intensity, according to the Saffir–Simpson scale Map key Saffir–Simpson scale Tropical depression (≤38 mph, ≤62 km/h) Tropical storm (39–73 mph, 63–118 km/h) Category 1 (74–95 mph, 119–153 km/h) Category 2 (96–110 mph, 154–177 km/h) Category 3 (111–129 mph, 178–208 km/h) Category 4 (130–156 mph, 209–251 km/h) Category 5 (≥157 mph, ≥252 km/h) Unknown Storm type Tropical cyclone Subtropical cyclone Extratropical cyclone, remnant low, tropical disturbance, or monsoon depression

Cyclone Giri was first identified by the India Meteorological Department (IMD) as an area of low pressure over the Bay of Bengal on October 19. Early on October 20, the system was classified as a depression and given the name BOB 04; and at that time, the system was situated roughly 250 km (155 mi) southwest of Sittwe, Myanmar. Continued development took place as convection consolidated around the system and banding features formed along the western side of the low. As the depression was situated in an area of weak wind shear, further development was anticipated over the following days. Early on October 21, the IMD upgraded the system to a deep depression and expected it to further intensify into a cyclonic storm within 24 hours. Shortly thereafter, the Joint Typhoon Warning Center (JTWC) issued their first advisory on the depression, classifying it as Tropical Cyclone 04B. The system rapidly developed throughout the day on October 21, developing an eye embedded within deep convection. In response to a near-equatorial ridge to the south, the system slowly tracked towards the northeast, placing Myanmar within its path. Around 0600 UTC, the IMD upgraded the system to a cyclonic storm, assigning it the name "Giri".

Tracking over an area of high sea surface temperatures, rapid intensification ensued during the latter half of October 21. Following the development of very intense convection, with estimated cloud top temperatures between −70 and −80 °C (−94 and −112 °F), Giri strengthened into a severe cyclonic storm, having sustained winds of at least 95 km/h (60 mph 3-minute sustained). Around 1800 UTC, the JTWC estimated that the system intensified into a Category 1 equivalent cyclone on the Saffir–Simpson hurricane scale. Early on October 22, Giri further strengthened into a very severe cyclonic storm as it slowly moved towards the central coast of Myanmar. Throughout the day, the storm underwent explosive deepening, attaining winds of 240 km/h (145 mph 1-minute sustained) by 0900 UTC. Satellite imagery depicted a well-defined 46 km (29 mi) wide eye surrounded by deep convection. Accompanied by strong poleward outflow, additional strengthening took place despite Giri's proximity to land.

In the hours before landfall on October 22, Giri attained its peak intensity with winds of 165 km/h (105 mph 3-minute sustained) and a barometric pressure of 950 mbar (hPa; 28.05 inHg). However, the JTWC estimated that Giri was a substantially stronger storm, nearly attaining Category 5 status; peak winds were believed to have reached 250 km/h (155 mph 1-minute sustained) along with an estimated pressure of 922 mbar (hPa; 27.23 inHg). Around 1400 UTC, Cyclone Giri made landfall near Hunter's Bay, roughly 50 km (31 mi) northwest of Kyaukpyu at peak intensity. Upon doing so, Giri became the most intense storm to ever strike Myanmar, surpassing Cyclone Nargis which struck the Irrawaddy Delta region as a low-end Category 4 equivalent in May 2008. However, according to the International Federation of Red Cross And Red Crescent Societies, substantial weakening had taken place within the hours before landfall; they estimated that Cyclone Giri struck the coastline with winds of 175 km/h (110 mph 1-minute sustained). Once overland, the cyclone rapidly decayed as convection dissipated. By early October 23, only scattered bursts of convection remained around the center of Giri as it degenerated into a tropical depression. The final advisory from the IMD was issued later that day as the system weakened further.

== Preparations ==
Shortly after Giri was classified a very severe cyclonic storm, warnings were issued for the coastline of Myanmar. Relative to the storm's intensity, preparations were minimal; however, this was because forecasters did not anticipate Giri to strengthen as quickly as it did. The greatest fear of the residents was the aftermath of the storm. There were concerns that the cyclone could cause devastation similar to that of Cyclone Nargis in May 2008 which killed an estimated 140,000 people in the Irrawaddy Delta. The chief of the Myanmar Climate Change Watch, a branch within the Myanmar Meteorology and Hydrology Department, urged people to move to higher grounds and into sturdy buildings as a storm surge up to 3.6 m (12 ft) was anticipated. Warnings of the storm were constantly broadcast through television, radio and newspapers. In Sittwe, the capital of Rakhine State, authorities used loudspeakers to warn residents about Cyclone Giri. According to the military junta, an estimated 53,000 are believed to have evacuated Kyaukphyu before the arrival of the storm.

Even though the storm was not expected to hit Bangladesh, the Bangladesh Meteorological Department issued storm signal five, "danger level", at ports of Cox's Bazar and Chittagong. Ships and vessels were also asked to return to shore quickly. On October 23, the warning signals were lowered as the threat from Giri diminished.

== Impact ==
According to local media, Cyclone Giri brought a storm surge up to 3.7 m (12 ft), along with waves up to 8 m (26 ft) and winds in excess of 260 km/h (160 mph). In Kyaukphyu, much of the city was left more than 1.2 m (3.9 ft) under water by the storm. Residents stated that most of Kyaukphyu was destroyed by Giri, with nearly every tree and lamppost felled and all structures damaged or destroyed. Later reports confirmed that roughly 70% of the city had been destroyed by Giri. In the Ashey Paing ward, an entire village was flattened by the storm as roughly 1,000 homes were destroyed. Near the Gangawtaw Pagoda in Kyaukphyu, nearly 100 homes were completely destroyed. The local Red Cross office in the city was also destroyed after a large tree fell on it due to high winds. Myebon Township was the hardest-hit area in the country: several villages were completely destroyed by the storm and many others were severely damaged. According to the United Nations, roughly 15,000 homes were destroyed by the storm throughout Rakhine State.

In the Seikphyu Township, flood waters up to 4.6 m (15 ft) deep inundated 20 villages after overflow from a dam was released without warning. Of the few reports coming from the region, there were indications of fatalities in outlying villages. Most of the livestock in the area perished as there was no time to bring them to higher ground safely. The overall timing of the cyclone's landfall was also devastating for the region. It came at the only harvest of the year for Rakhine State. According to the United Nations Food and Agriculture Organization, 16,187 hectares (40,000 acres) of rice paddies were destroyed and another 40,468 hectares (100,000 acres) were damaged.

Within a day of Giri striking Myanmar, three people were reported to have been killed by the storm and tens of thousands of residents were believed to have been left homeless. By October 25, officials in Myanmar stated that the death toll had risen to 50 and at least 30 people in the Pyin Wan Village were missing. Press reports stated that "The situation here is alarming", as more bodies were discovered. Offshore, more than 100 fishermen from Myanmar and Bangladesh were reported missing after 21 ships were caught in rough seas produced by the cyclone. By October 29, at least 94 people were confirmed to have been killed by Giri. Of these fatalities, 84 were in Myebon Township (Mray Bon) and 10 in Pauktaw Township. However, according to local relief groups, the death toll had risen over 100.

By November 2, 157 fatalities had been confirmed as a result of Cyclone Giri. Of these fatalities, 138 were in Myebon Township, 11 in Pauktaw Township, 5 in Minbya Township and 3 in Kyaukpyu Township. According to officials in Kyaukpyu Township, damage from the storm amounted to Ks.2.34 billion (US$359 million).

== Aftermath ==
Immediately following the storm, urgent requests for food and clean water were made by residents in the hardest hit areas. By the afternoon of October 23, the Red Cross began deploying relief supplies to the affected region; 300 tents and 150 bags of rice were planned to be distributed to Kyaukphyu where at least 5,000 people were left homeless. According to the United Nations Office for the Coordination of Humanitarian Affairs (OCHA), a total of 176,823 people were affected by the storm and 70,795 were left homeless. By October 30, the number affected and homeless had risen to 1.1 million and roughly 100,000 respectively. Red Cross officials also reported that an estimated 60,000 people were in need of assistance throughout Myanmar. Later that day, a relief charity was opened in Rangoon to aid victims of the storm; in short order, the charity had received donations of Ks.10 million ($10,000 USD). By October 25, temporary shelter camps set up by relief agencies housed an estimated 5,000 people.

By October 26, the Government of the Union of Myanmar had begun distributing 60,000 zinc roof sheets and the Ministry of Forestry provided 200 tonnes (220 tons) of timber. Through the end of October, six non-governmental organizations in Myanmar planned to distribute emergency food supplies, such rice, oil, salt and pulses, to 5,000 residents in Kyaukpyu and Myebon. Health supplies were also being distributed at relief camps by UNICEF in the hardest-hit areas. About 500 family kits containing non-food items, such as tarpaulins and mosquito nets, had been distributed by the Myanmar Red Cross Society and another 1,200 were being sent to the area. By the start of November, the government of Myanmar requested medial aid from the United Nations as a cholera outbreak began to unfold. Additional post-storm diseases such as diarrhoea, dysentery, eye infections and skin diseases became prevalent as well. According to locals, at least six people died as a result of cholera. At least 200 people were infected with dysentery and four were killed by the disease in the towns of Kyaukphyu, Minbya and Myebon. The cause of the outbreak was linked to a lack of clean water.

=== International assistance ===
On October 26, United States Secretary of State Hillary Clinton stated that the country would provide emergency assistance and aid to Myanmar. Roughly a week after the passage of Cyclone Giri, the government of Australia pledged about US$200,000 to victims of the storm. The governments of Britain and Japan also pledged to donate US$700,000 and US$500,000 respectively to Myanmar. The World Food Programme sent 900 tonnes (992 tons) of rice with another 300 tonnes (330 tons) on the way; stocks of rice in Kyaukpyu itself had reportedly been exhausted. By late-November, the World Food Programme had allocated US$2.8 million in relief funds. Roughly 1,500 households in Kyaukpyu township were being cared for by Save the Children. Through the United Nations, organizations pledged to provide a total of US$54 million in aid. In late-November, the United States provided an additional US$3 million in relief funds.

=== Criticism of the Junta ===
International and local media criticized the military government for inadequate warnings prior to Giri's landfall in the country. However, the junta claims to have informed the public appropriately. Little assistance had reached thousands of survivors days after the storm's passage, fueling anger from local media sources. Government relief slowly reached the area; however, workers only cleared debris left by the storm and only encouraged residents to rebuild by giving them the supplies needed to do so. Further criticism was made about the government withholding information on the loss of life and scale of damage. Requests were also made to postpone a national election for residents in Arakan State; however, no response was given and the elections were still planned to be held on November 7.

Additional criticism continued even a week after the storm, especially over the scale of the disaster. The government claimed that only 27 people had been killed by Giri while numerous local and international agencies stated significantly higher totals. They were also blamed for downplaying the amount of damage, resulting in slower distribution of aid to areas in desperate need. Two weeks after Giri struck Myanmar, little attention was given to the ongoing disaster by the Junta. The Myanmar government continued to keep other countries out of the area and prevent them from knowing what was going on in the hardest hit areas. Thousands of survivors continued to suffer due to the insufficient relief making it into the region. On November 8, local media discovered that the junta was threatening to sever aid to the region if residents did not vote for them in the national election. According to Mizzima, the opposing party won landslide victories in numerous townships; however, in the cyclone affected areas, the Junta had complete victories.

== See also ==
- Cyclone Nargis
- Cyclone Mala
- Cyclone Maarutha
- Cyclone Mocha
- Tropical cyclones in Myanmar
