= Cyclone Jal =

2010 cyclonic storm

Severe Cyclonic Storm Jal
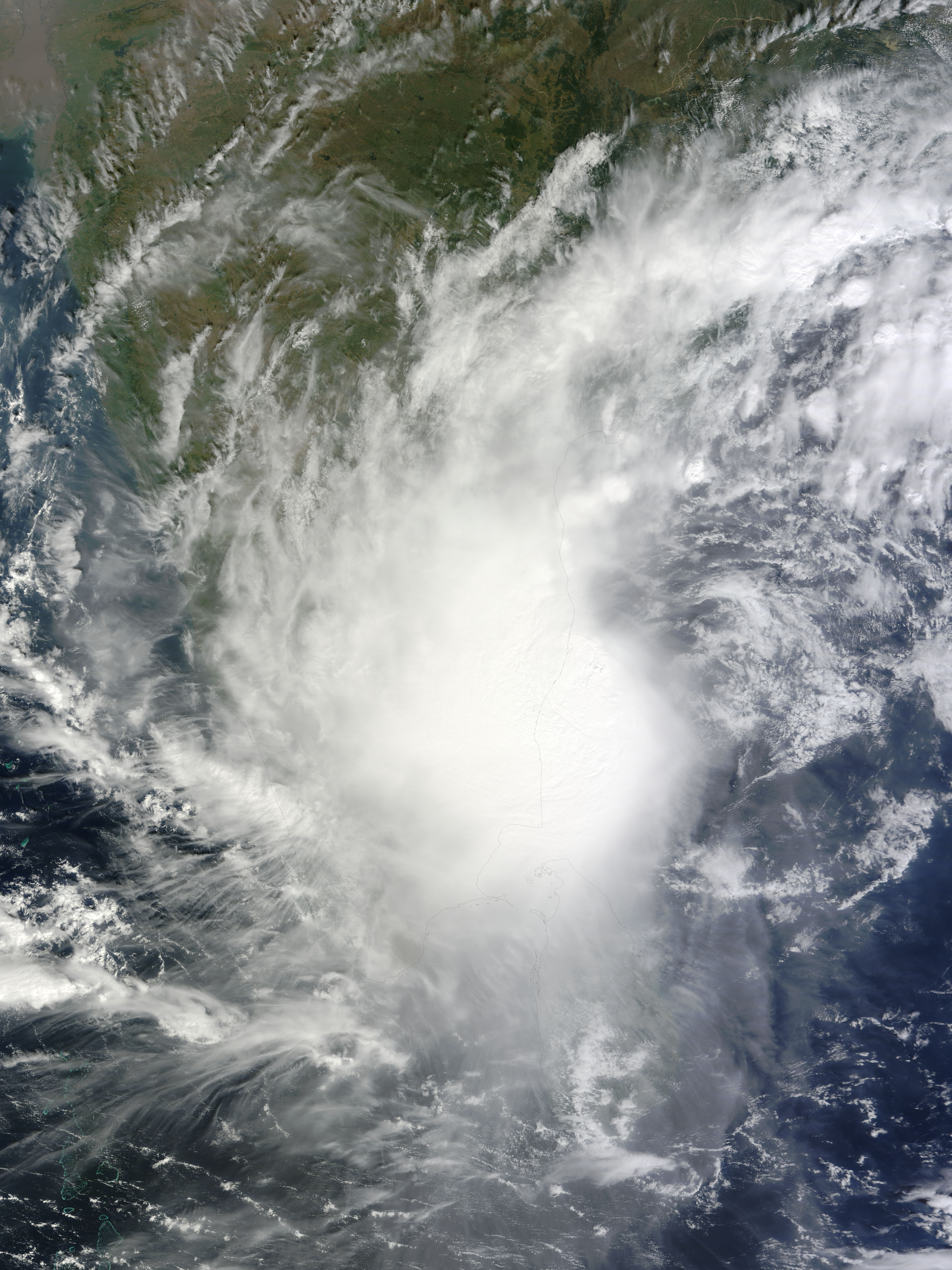
- Severe Cyclonic Storm Jal near Chennai, Tamil Nadu, India, at peak intensity on 7 November

Meteorological history
- Formed: 1 November 2010
- Remnant low: 8 November 2010
- Dissipated: 12 November 2010

Severe cyclonic storm
- 3-minute sustained (IMD)
- Highest winds: 110 km/h (70 mph)
- Lowest pressure: 988 hPa (mbar); 29.18 inHg

Tropical storm
- 1-minute sustained (SSHWS/JTWC)
- Highest winds: 100 km/h (65 mph)
- Lowest pressure: 982 hPa (mbar); 29.00 inHg

Overall effects
- Fatalities: 118
- Missing: 12
- Damage: $1.73 billion (2010 USD)
- Areas affected: Borneo, Brunei, Malaysia, Malay Peninsula, Andaman Islands, Sri Lanka, India
- IBTrACS
- Part of the 2010 North Indian Ocean cyclone season

Severe Cyclonic Storm Jal (Note: The name Jal (Hindi: जल; [d͡ʒɐl]) was contributed by India and means "water" in Hindi.) was the fifth named cyclonic storm and the fourth Severe Cyclonic Storm of the 2010 North Indian Ocean cyclone season. Jal developed from a low-pressure area in the South China Sea that organized into a Tropical Depression on 28 October. At least 54 people are known to have been killed in India. As a tropical depression, Jal produced torrential rains over parts of Thailand and Malaysia, triggering severe flooding which killed 59 and four people in the two countries respectively. In Sri Lanka, heavy rainfall with strong winds have caused flooding affecting around 80,000 people. In Thailand, Jal was responsible for 78 deaths, being the 4th deadliest tropical cyclone in the country.

== Meteorological history ==
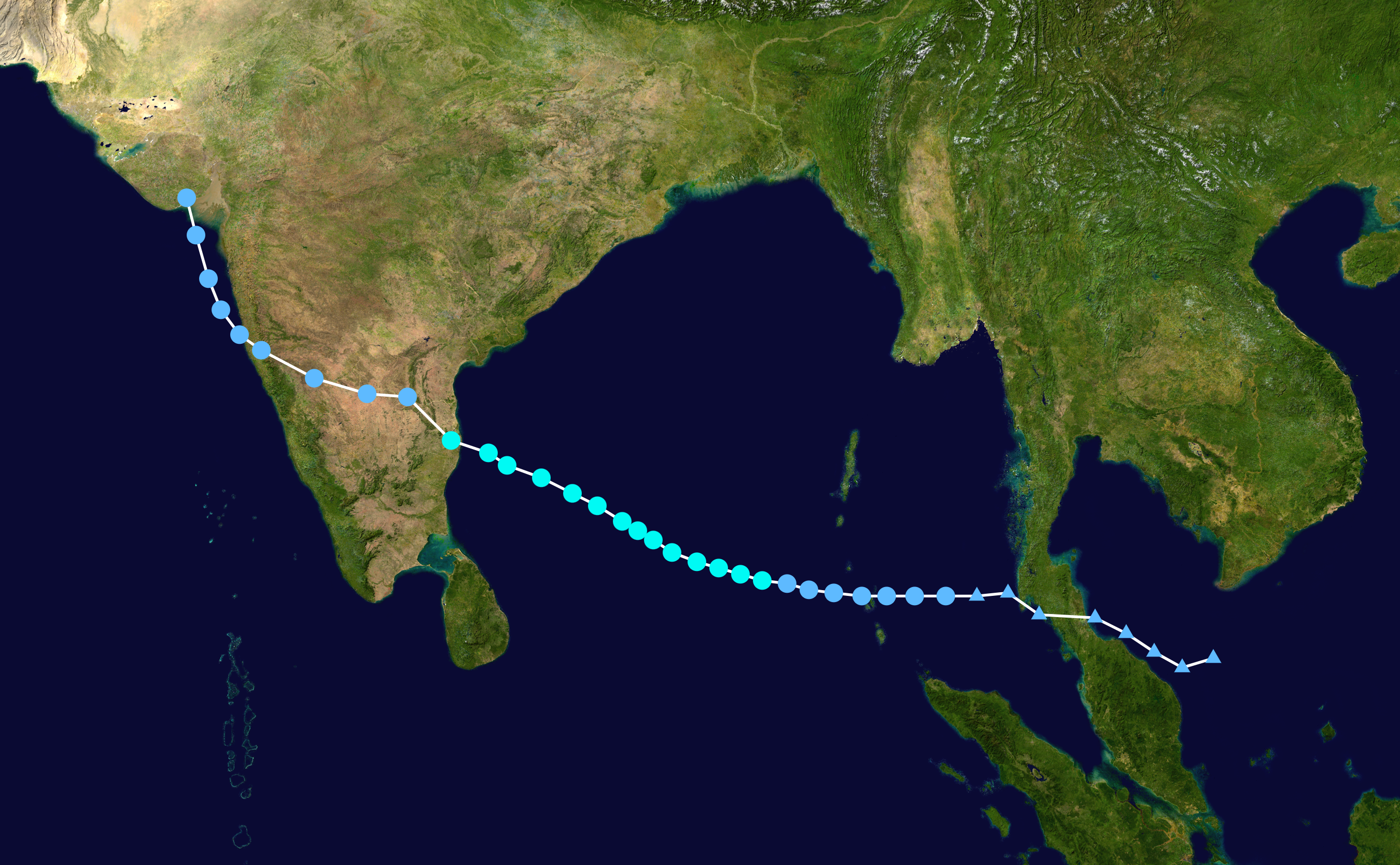
Map plotting the storm's track and intensity, according to the Saffir–Simpson scale Map key Saffir–Simpson scale Tropical depression (≤38 mph, ≤62 km/h) Tropical storm (39–73 mph, 63–118 km/h) Category 1 (74–95 mph, 119–153 km/h) Category 2 (96–110 mph, 154–177 km/h) Category 3 (111–129 mph, 178–208 km/h) Category 4 (130–156 mph, 209–251 km/h) Category 5 (≥157 mph, ≥252 km/h) Unknown Storm type Tropical cyclone Subtropical cyclone Extratropical cyclone, remnant low, tropical disturbance, or monsoon depression

On 12 October, a weak tropical disturbance formed within a monsoonal trough of low pressure in the South China Sea, just off the eastern coast of Borneo. For the next few weeks, the system stalled on the eastern coast of Bormeo, remaining disorganized, while the system barely affected the island of Borneo at all. During the last week of October, the storm detached from the moonsonal trough, and began slowly moving east. On 29 October, the Japan Meteorological Agency (JMA) and the Joint Typhoon Warning Center (JTWC) both reported that the system had begun to develop, already beginning to organize itself, about 550 km (340 mi), to the southeast of Ho Chi Minh City, Vietnam. During the next few days, the tropical depression strengthened slowly as it slowly moved towards the eastern border of the Indian Ocean. During this time, convection around the disturbance increased, but failed to organize around the storm's low level circulation center. Despite these unfavorable conditions, the storm managed to develop convection around its area of low pressure, and organized itself significantly. On 31 October, the Thai and Malaysian meteorological departments (TMD) reported that the disturbance had developed into a tropical depression, and initiated advisories on the system. From 31 October continuing into 1 November, the storm strengthened slightly as it continued moving towards the Indian Ocean, but not enough for it to become a tropical storm. Late on 1 November, the tropical depression crossed the Malay Peninsula, and entered the extreme eastern part of the Indian Ocean, causing the west Pacific agencies to cancel all their advisories on the storm, as it was no longer in the west Pacific Ocean. As soon as the system entered the extreme eastern border of the Indian Ocean, the India Meteorological Agency (IMD) immediately declared the storm a depression, and began issuing advisories on the system, because the system had already organized itself into a tropical depression in the west Pacific Ocean, on 31 October, which was a day before the system entered the IMD's area of responsibility. Later on 1 November, the system began showing signs of further, but slow organization, as the system continued moving west slowly. Early on 2 November, the Malaysian Meteorological Department (MMD) also issued their first advisory on the system, and the IMD simply called it Depression, because the storm had not yet entered the Bay of Bengal. Later on that day, the IMD reported that the system had weakened into an area of low pressure, due to the effects of crossing the Malay Peninsula, but they forecast it to become a depression soon again, as the storm was moving over warm water. Late on 3 November, the Joint Typhoon Warning Center (JTWC) issued a Tropical Cyclone Formation Alert on the system, as it began reorganizing itself. Early on 4 November, the India Meteorological Department (IMD) upgraded the area of low pressure to a depression again, this time giving it the designation "BOB 05", as the system had now entered the Bay of Bengal. On 5 November, the Joint Typhoon Warning Center (JTWC) designated the system as Tropical Cyclone 05B.

Early on 6 November, the IMD upgraded Depression BOB 05 to a deep depression. Later, the deep depression strengthened further, prompting the IMD to upgrade it to a cyclonic storm, and was named Jal. The storm continued to grow and became a severe cyclonic storm by 6 November. Soon afterward, it was upgraded to a Category 1 Tropical Cyclone by the JTWC. On 7 November, Jal started weakening. Soon afterward, the IMD reported that Jal weakened into a Cyclonic Storm. Later that day, the JTWC downgraded Jal into a Tropical storm. Late on the same day, the IMD reported that the storm weakened into a Deep Depression. As a deep depression, the system made landfall at Chennai, a few hours later. The system continued to weaken and became a depression by early hours of 8 November. The depression continued to weaken until it dissipated into a remnant low on the same day. While on that very same day the IMD said that there is a possibility of re-strengthening of Jal's remnants over north east Arabian sea. And as the IMD said, the system moved into the Arabian Sea without weakening by early 9 November. But instead of moving across the Arabian Sea, the depression moved north along the western coast of India, restrengthening slightly, but not enough for it to regenerate. Within a few hours, the storm started moving inland, due to the prevailing winds. The system rapidly weakened as it moved farther inland over the next few days, causing severe flooding along the way. Early on 12 November, the remnants of Cyclone Jal were completely absorbed by a non-tropical low over the Himalayas.

== Preparations and impact ==
Death toll
Malaysia	4
Thailand	59
India	55
Total	118
Note: Total as of 12 November 2010

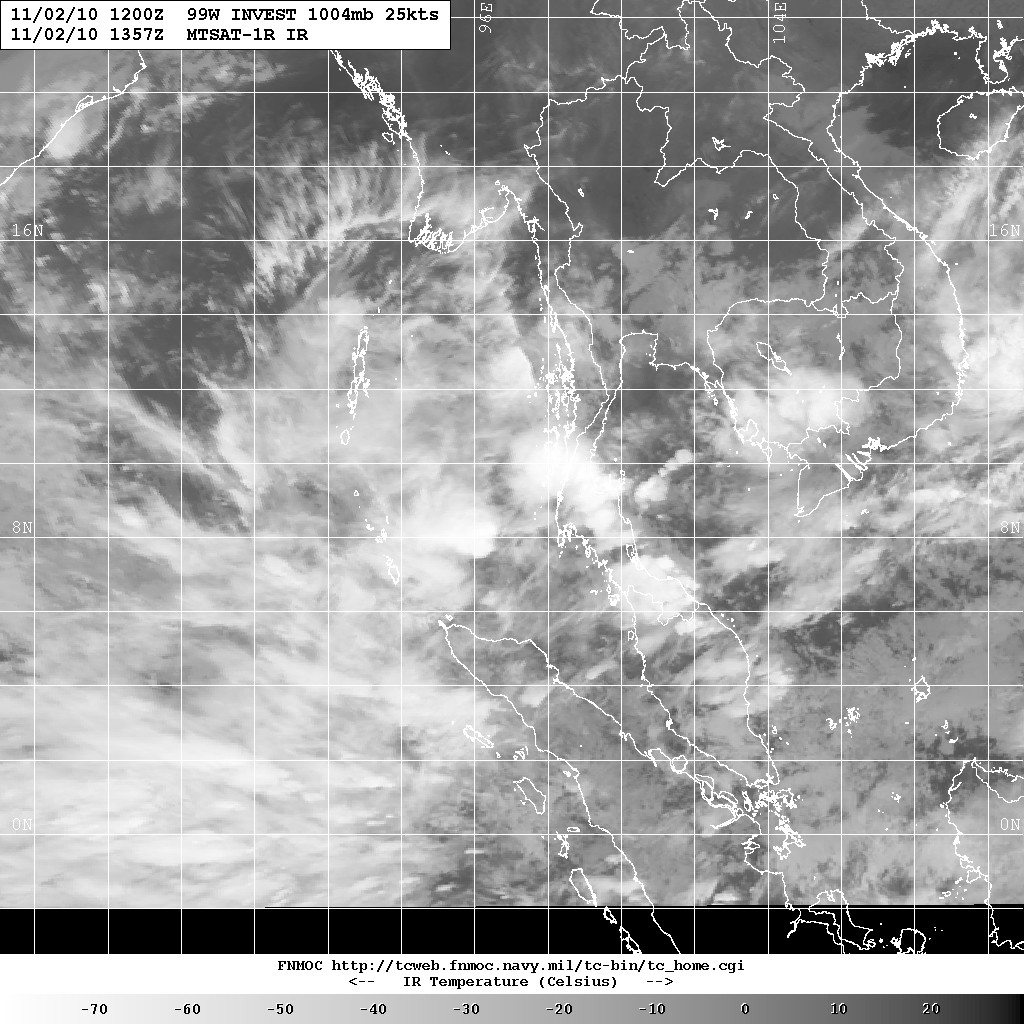
Cyclone Jal as a tropical depression, late on November 1, in the middle of crossing the Malay Peninsula

=== Thailand ===
When Jal was just a low-pressure area, it hit Thailand and strengthened into a depression. As a result, heavy to very heavy rains battered the country causing extensive flooding and claimed 59 lives. The government of Thailand estimated the total damage to be 50 billion baht (US$1.68 billion).

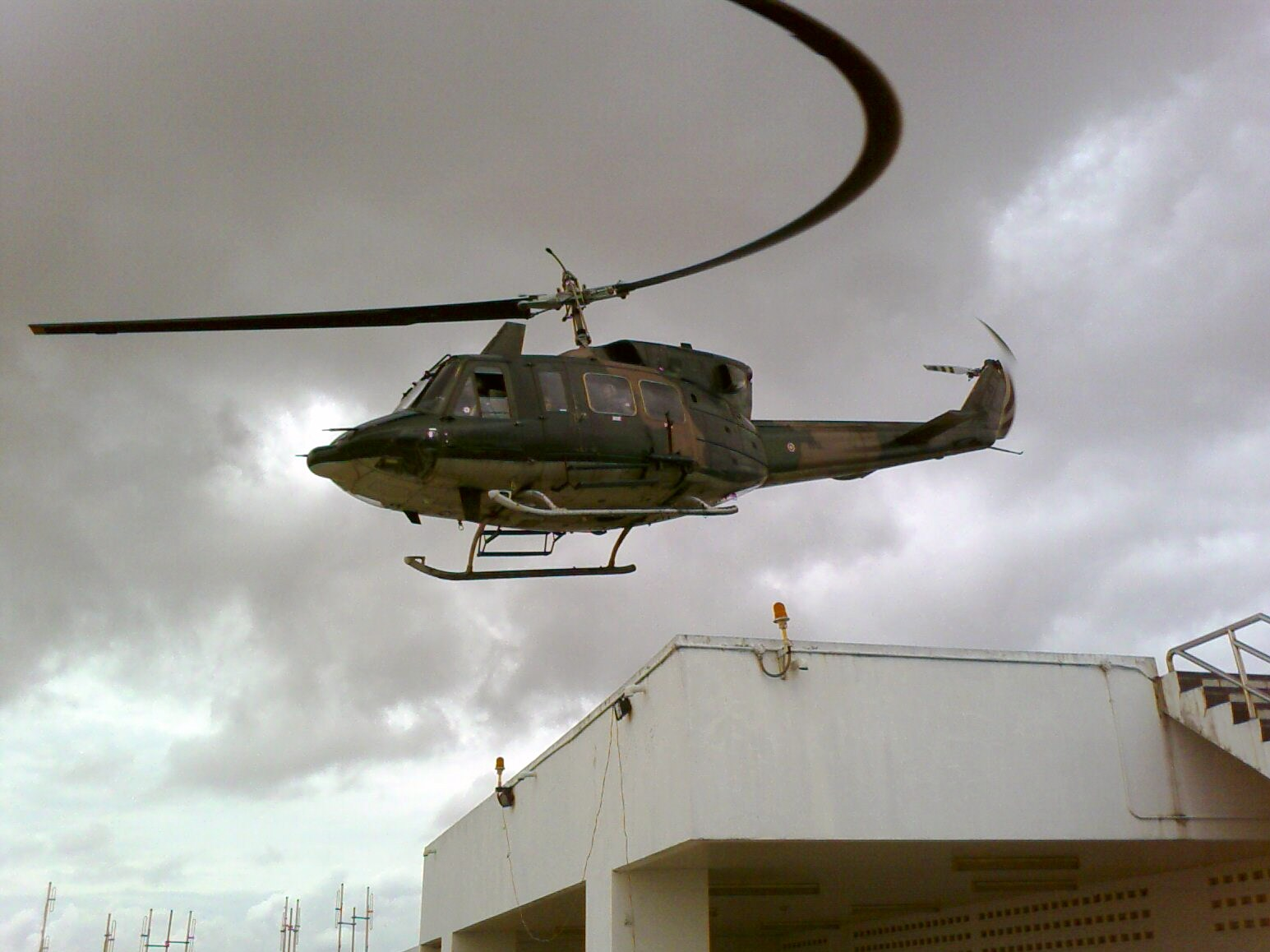
An Armed Forces helicopter delivering supplies to Hat Yai Hospital. Critical patients had to be transferred by helicopter to Songklanagarin Hospital after emergency power supplies failed.

Rail service to the region was partially restored Thursday morning and the airport on Samui island, a popular tourist destination in the Gulf of Thailand, reopened after a temporary shutdown caused by a submerged runway. On the bright side, the research centre predicted the floods would bring seed money back into the economic system as the government would earmark relief funds for flood victims and rehabilitation of the flooded areas. In Hat Yai, many residents were caught off-guard by the flash flood despite evacuation warnings, suggesting either that the cautions were unheard or simply ignored. Urban planning, national irrigation strategies and flood control systems also need a drastic rethink, particularly when one considers the future threat that climate change and rising sea levels will have on Bangkok and other populated coastal areas in the years to come.

The Thai community in Brunei has been urged to provide humanitarian relief to the victims of the flood-affected areas back home. Thawat, the Acting Ambassador of Thai Embassy said that the donations can be given in the form of money or goods such as clothing. As the water level in many areas, including Hat Yai district of Songkhla, has receded significantly and Prime Minister Abhisit Vejjajiva has already handed out the first lot of 5,000-baht cash aid to flood-affected families in the Northeast as an initial compensation amount from the government, it remains to be seen if families who suffered casualties will receive compensation from the Fund for Disaster Victims as promised.

Private citizens were on the forefront, soliciting donations from other members of the public, rushing aid to flood-stricken areas and distributing relief packages to flood victims. The opposition Puea Thai Party on Friday petitioned the National Anti-Corruption Commission (NACC) to take legal action against Prime Minister Abhisit Vejjajiva, claiming he acted too slowly to counter the effects from the recent flooding, resulting in massive damage to property and many deaths. The petition filed by Puea Thai spokesman Prompong Nopparit accuses the prime minister of malfeasance in violation of Article 157 of the Criminal Code. Mr Prompong said the prime minister has the administrative power to ensure swift action to prevent and mitigate effects from flooding under Article 4 of the Disaster Prevention and Mitigation Act of 2007, but had not properly exercised his authority. The Chairman of the Standing Committee of the National People's Congress thanked and expressed his concern toward the flood situation in Thailand, which was the worst flood in 50 years, with 50 provinces affected. The Chinese government intends to provide humanitarian aid and has granted 10 million yuan for the flooded area's restoration.

=== Malaysia ===
As a tropical depression, Jal produced substantial rainfall over parts of northern Malaysia, triggering severe flooding which killed at least four people. Nearly 50,000 people were forced to leave their homes due to rising flood waters. The severity of damage also prompted the closure of an airport and the regions major highway.

The floods affected transportation in and around Kedah and Perlis, shutting down rail and closing roads including the North–South Expressway. Alor Setar's Sultan Abdul Halim Airport was also closed after its runway was flooded, leaving helicopters as the only mode of aerial transport into Kedah and Perlis. The floods also contaminated water supply in Kedah and Perlis, forcing the states to receive supplies from the neighbouring state of Perak.

Rice production, a key industry in Kedah and Perlis, was badly affected by the floods. According to the federal government, over 45,000 hectares of rice fields were damaged in Kedah alone. The government pledged 26 million ringgit in aid to farmers in both states. In Perlis, the floods submerged over two-thirds of the state's land in water. The north-eastern state of Kelantan was also affected by the floods, causing the closure of some schools.

The floods triggered immediate political fallout. The Federal Minister for Housing and Local Government and Alor Setar MP Chor Chee Heung criticised the Kedah State government (led by the Pan-Malaysian Islamic Party, an opponent of Chor's Barisan Nasional coalition) for what he considered a slow response to the floods and the government's inexperience. Chor's own home in Alor Setar was flooded. Deputy Prime Minister Muhyiddin Yassin claimed the State government had a responsibility to assist victims of the flood. Kedah's Chief Minister Azizan argued that his government's response had been "quick" and that 300,000 ringgit in aid had been committed to the affected areas. Kedah's Sultan Abdul Halim called publicly for politics to be set aside for the purposes of dealing with the floods.

=== India ===
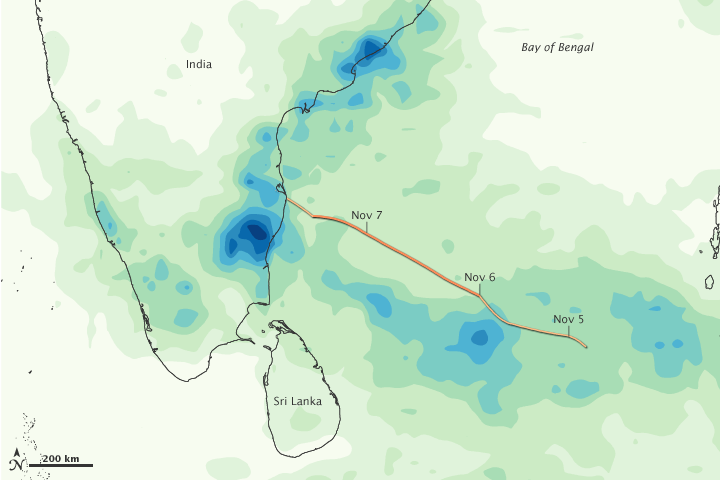
A map showing the total rainfall from Cyclone Jal in India

A cyclone warning was issued to the east Indian coasts which were already hit by a strong monsoonal trough that caused severe flooding and killed hundreds of people displacing many more. Storm warning signals were hoisted in Ganjam and Jagatsinghpur districts of Orissa. Over 70,000 people evacuated from four districts of Andhra Pradesh, the authorities provided shelter in relief camps across interior Andhra Pradesh. Five teams of 40–50 rescuers arrived at the low lying, already flooded areas in Andhra Pradesh where the impact of the system was expected to be worse.

As the cyclone neared landfall, heavy rainfall caused mudslides and flooding. On 9 November, The Andhra Pradesh chief minister Konijeti Rosaiah said that about 54 have died in India due to the storm. The National Disaster Response Force at Arakkonam in Tamil Nadu shifted their personnel to Nellore in order to supervise the rescue and relief operations.

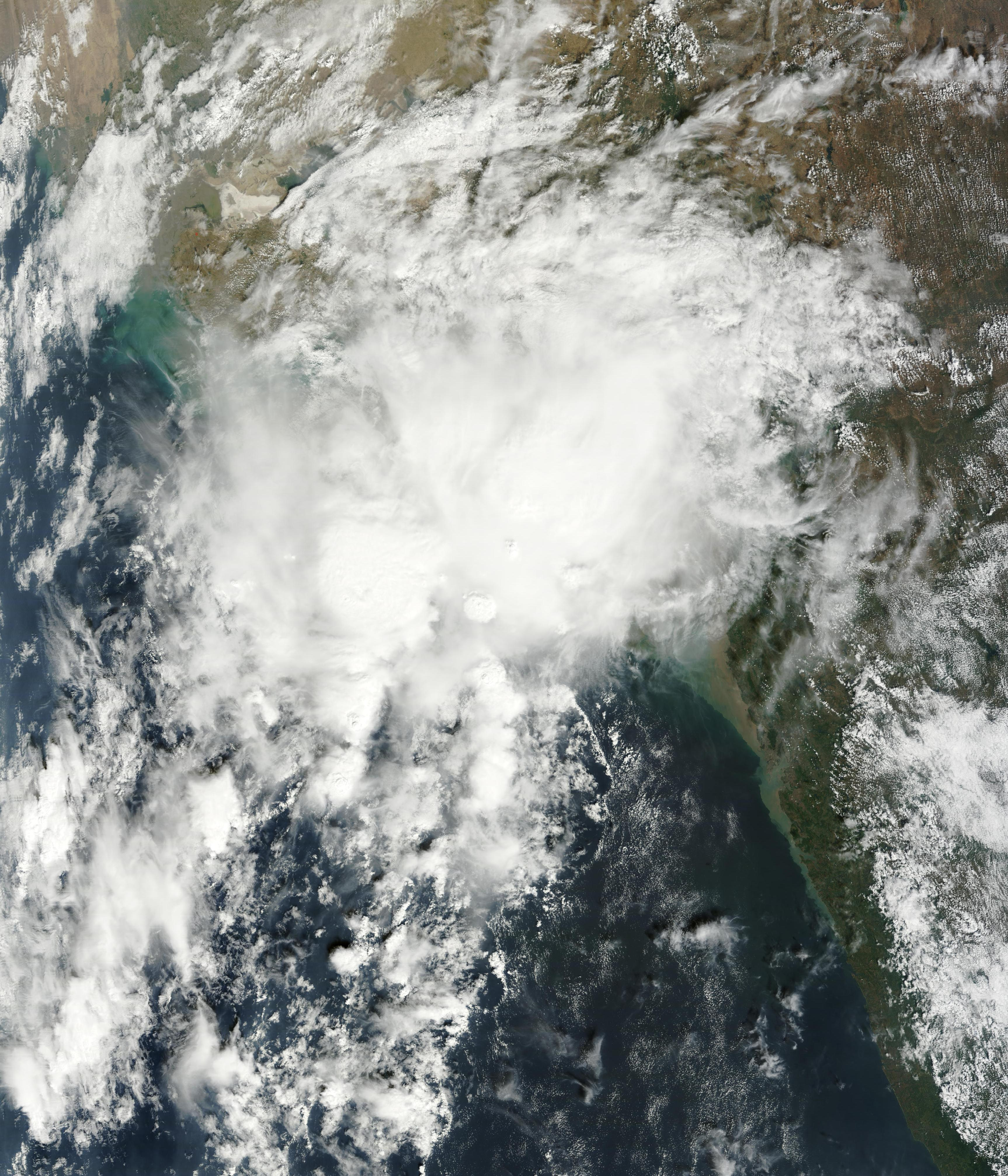
The remnants of former Cyclone Jal (05B), over Gujarat, India, on November 10

Over 16 flights scheduled to land at Chennai were diverted to Bangalore because of poor visibility. It was reported that around 300 thousand hectares of cropland was devastated by the cyclone. Power outages occurred at many places in Tamil Nadu and Andhra Pradesh throughout Sunday. The Indian government said that they would be giving twenty kilograms of rice and five litres of kerosene to each family in flood-affected areas. They would also give ₹200,000 to the families of the victims. Preliminary estimation of the damage in Nellore district was ₹1 billion (US$22.5 million), while the damage in Prakasam district was assessed to be ₹500 million (US$11.3 million). Crop loss in East Godavari district was estimated at ₹5 billion (US$113 million). Coastal and interior areas of Karnataka too faced heavy rains due to the cyclone. One person was killed in Chennai, Tamil Nadu when a tree toppled.

As the remnants of Jal continued to move northwest, they brought light to moderate spells of rain in India's warmest state of Rajasthan. Later on, light to moderate spells of rain also battered the state of Gujarat.

=== Sri Lanka ===
Cyclone Jal was about 400 km away from Trincomalee, but it moved towards South India to make a landfall there. However, heavy rainfall with strong winds and rough sea conditions were warned by the Sri Lankan Meteorological Department.

After the dissipation of Cyclone Jal over western India on 8 November, heavy thundershowers occurred in almost all parts of Sri Lanka on 10 November, and by 08:30 am 11 November Colombo had received a rainfall of 443 mm within the previous 24 hours. It was the highest rainfall Colombo had received in a day after 18 years. Many of the lowlands in and around Colombo were flooded. Officials announced that around 80,000 people were affected by the floods in Colombo district. Navy boats and Air Force helicopters were also summoned for relief activities.

== See also ==
- Cyclone Vardah
- Cyclone Lehar
- Tropical Depression Wilma (2013)
