= Cyclone Laila =

North Indian Ocean cyclone in 2010

Severe Cyclonic Storm Laila
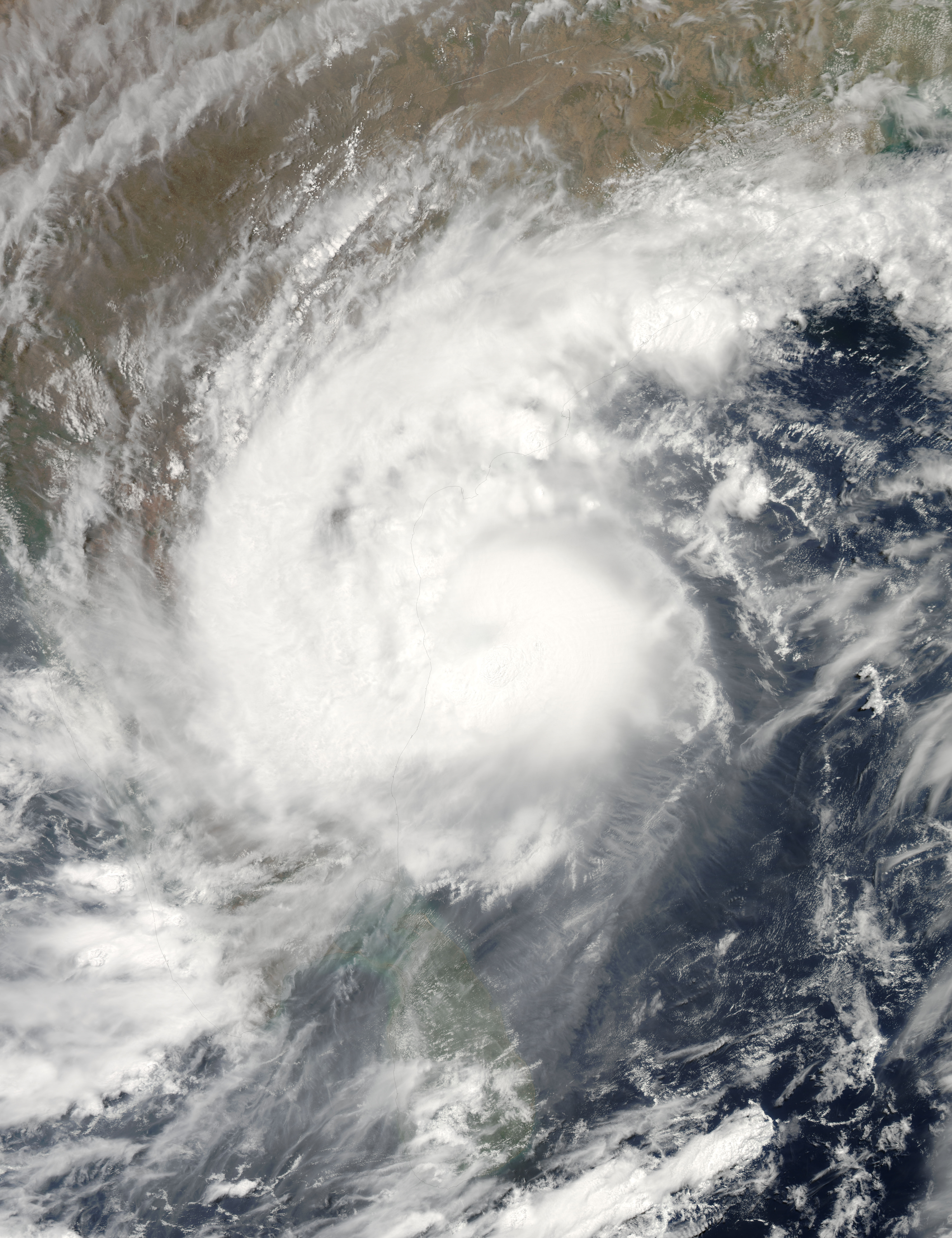
- Cyclone Laila on 19 May

Meteorological history
- Formed: 17 May 2010
- Dissipated: 21 May 2010

Severe cyclonic storm
- 3-minute sustained (IMD)
- Highest winds: 100 km/h (65 mph)
- Lowest pressure: 986 hPa (mbar); 29.12 inHg

Category 1-equivalent tropical cyclone
- 1-minute sustained (SSHWS/JTWC)
- Highest winds: 120 km/h (75 mph)
- Lowest pressure: 974 hPa (mbar); 28.76 inHg

Overall effects
- Fatalities: 65 total
- Damage: $117 million (2010 USD)
- Areas affected: Sri Lanka, India
- IBTrACS
- Part of the 2010 North Indian Ocean cyclone season

Severe Cyclonic Storm Laila (Note: The name Laila (Urdu: لیلی, [lɛːlɑː]) was contributed by Pakistan and is a feminine given name meaning "night" in Urdu.) was the first cyclonic storm to affect southeastern India in May since the 1990 Andhra Pradesh cyclone. The first tropical cyclone of the annual season, Laila developed on 17 May 2010 in the Bay of Bengal from a persistent area of convection. Strengthening as it tracked northwestward, it became a severe cyclonic storm on 19 May. The next day, Laila made landfall in Andhra Pradesh, and it later dissipated over land. It caused flooding and damage along its path. It was the worst storm to hit Andhra Pradesh in the last 14 years.

== Meteorological history ==
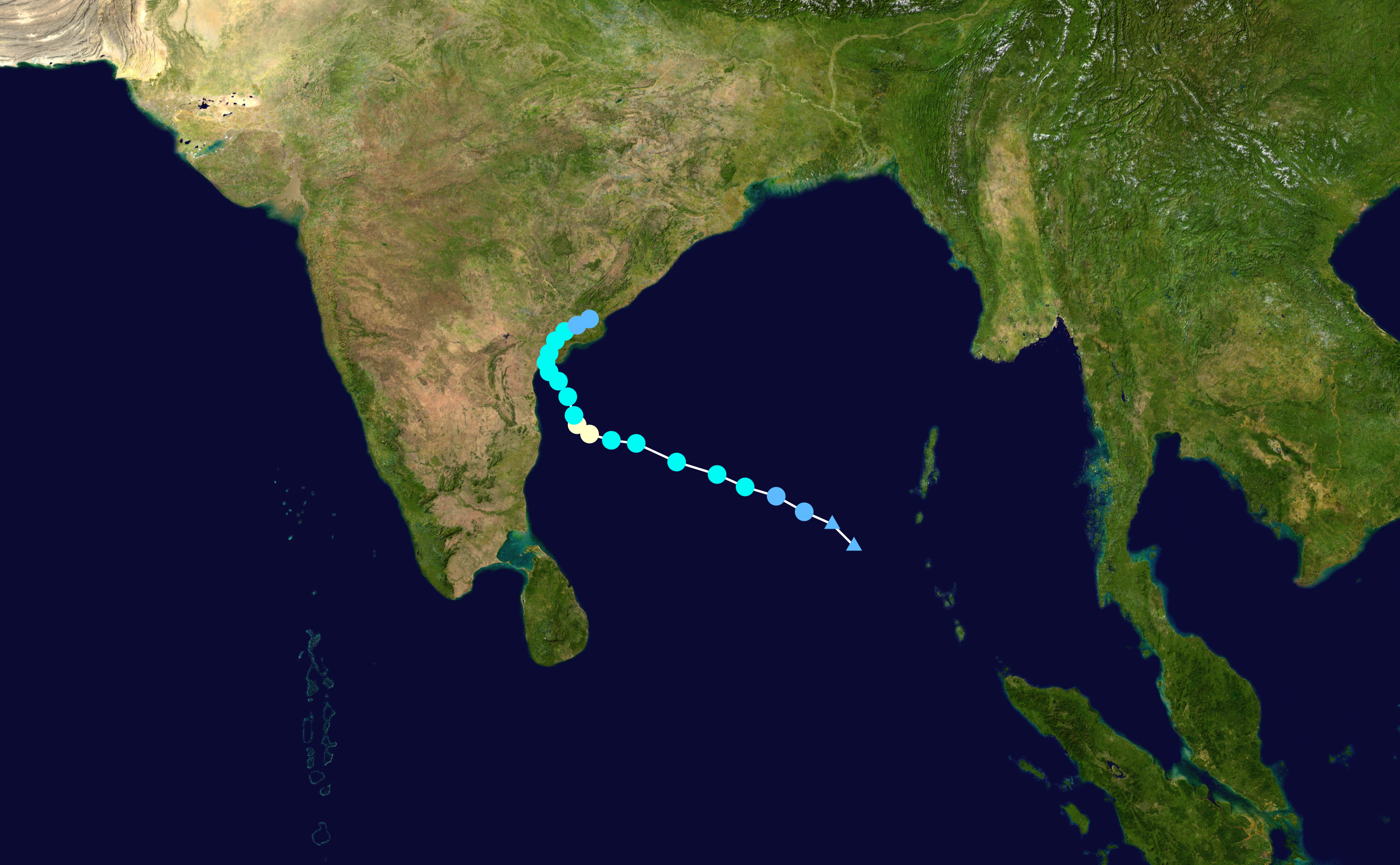
Map plotting the storm's track and intensity, according to the Saffir–Simpson scale Map key Saffir–Simpson scale Tropical depression (≤38 mph, ≤62 km/h) Tropical storm (39–73 mph, 63–118 km/h) Category 1 (74–95 mph, 119–153 km/h) Category 2 (96–110 mph, 154–177 km/h) Category 3 (111–129 mph, 178–208 km/h) Category 4 (130–156 mph, 209–251 km/h) Category 5 (≥157 mph, ≥252 km/h) Unknown Storm type Tropical cyclone Subtropical cyclone Extratropical cyclone, remnant low, tropical disturbance, or monsoon depression

In the middle of May 2010, an area of convection, or thunderstorms, persisted about 865 miles (1400 km) south of the Indian city of Kolkata (formerly Calcutta) in the Bay of Bengal. It was initially disorganized, although satellite imagery indicated a mid-level circulation. After a few days, the convection began consolidating around a developing low-level circulation, and rainbands became evident. With low amounts of wind shear in the region, the Joint Typhoon Warning Center (JTWC) assessed its chances of development as fair. The official warning agency in the basin – the India Meteorological Department (IMD) – classified the system as Depression BOB 001 at 0900 UTC on 17 May. About three hours after the depression was first classified, the IMD upgraded the system to a deep depression, indicating sustained winds of at least 34 mph (55 km/h).

Late on 17 May, the JTWC classified the system as Tropical Cyclone 01B, based on further organization. By that time, it was located about 485 miles (780 km) east-southeast of Chennai, Tamil Nadu, and was moving westward due to its position southwest of the subtropical ridge. The IMD upgraded the deep depression to Cyclonic Storm Laila early on 18 May. With further consolidation of the convection throughout the day, the JTWC noted that the storm "[appeared] to be rapidly intensifying", which is a term referring to a quick drop in barometric pressure that usually coincides with a sharp increase in winds. By late on 18 May, an eye feature became evident on satellite imagery, and at 0000 UTC on 19 May, the JTWC assessed Laila as producing peak winds of 75 mph (120 km/h), the equivalent of a minimal hurricane. A few hours later, the IMD upgraded Laila to a severe cyclonic storm.

After reaching peak intensity, Laila briefly decelerated as it moved around tan increasing, and the cyclone began weakening as it remained just off the coast. Between 1100 and 1200 UTC on 20 May, Laila made landfall near Bapatla, Andhra Pradesh.

== Preparations and impact ==
Death toll
Region	Total deaths	Source(s)
Sri Lanka	20	
Andhra Pradesh	36	
Tamil Nadu	9	
Totals:	65	

=== Sri Lanka ===
Cyclone Laila displaced nearly 280,000 people, triggering floods, delaying flights and submerging many areas of capital Colombo. The indirect impact of the cyclone was compounded as heavy pre-monsoonal showers set in over parts of the country as the storm developed over the Bay of Bengal. The Sri Lanka air force helicopters and navy vessels were pressed into service to ferry stranded passengers from Colombo to the international airport after parts of the connecting roads were washed away. All international and domestic flights were either delayed or cancelled because of heavy rain. Colombo experienced 350 mm of rain over the last five days ending 20 May.

Thousands of passengers were also stranded after railway tracks were flooded across the country. Several train stations had to suspend operations. The Lankan Parliament, located in a Colombo suburb, was adjourned after an adjoining lake threatened to overflow and flood the premises. The weather conditions experienced were caused after Sri Lanka was hit by 'feeder bands' (clouds on the outer spirals of a cyclone but connected to its centre) of the cyclone as it moved up the Indian east coast.

=== India ===
==== Andhra Pradesh ====
Early in the duration of the cyclone, the IMD noted the potential for heavy rainfall and gusty winds along the coast of Andhra Pradesh. The agency advised fishermen to avoid being in open seas. Additionally, the agency contacted state governments in the region to warn of the storm's threat. The weather office has stated that the cyclone will not have an effect on the monsoon season.

Cyclone Laila battered Ongole town; it received heavy rain of 320 mm on 20 May and 142 mm on 21 May, and has made rivulets like Gundlakamma, Addavagu and Pothurajukalva swollen. Addanki received the highest rainfall of 522 mm, followed by Maddipadu with 510 mm and Kothapatnam 258 mm in 24 hours on 21 May.

The cyclone caused heavy destruction in Prakasam, Krishna and Guntur districts and preliminary reports prepared by the State government put the loss at over Rs 500 crore. According to a BBC report, Cyclone Laila was the worst storm to hit Andhra Pradesh in 14 years.

==== Tamil Nadu ====
Nine people were killed in rain related incidents in Tamil Nadu, as the cyclonic storm "Laila" battered the Coastal areas in Northern parts of Tamil Nadu, Chennai city and its suburbs.
