= MV Dubai Moon =

- MV Dubai Moon listing before sinking

History
- Name: M/S Dana Optima
- Owner: P/R (DFDS A/S & DFDS UK) Ltd.
- Operator: DFDS A/S
- Builder: Elsinore Værft A/S, Helsingør, Denmark
- Laid down: 29 September 1977
- Launched: 16 June 1978
- Christened: 11 November 1978
- In service: 14 November 1978
- Name: Nopal Optima
- Owner: P/R (DFDS A/S & DFDS UK) Ltd.
- Operator: Nopal Caribe Lines inc.
- Acquired: 31 August 1978
- Name: Optima
- Owner: P/R (DFDS A/S & DFDS UK) Ltd.
- Operator: Nopal Caribe Lines inc.
- Acquired: 31 August 1978
- Name: Dana Optima
- Christened: 1 November 1983
- Fate: Sold February 1984
- Name: Meskerem
- Owner: Ethiopian Shipping Lines
- Acquired: 14 February 1984
- Fate: Sold May 2000
- Name: Marag III
- Owner: Hanan Cleaning Cargo & Shipping Co., Batum
- Acquired: May 2000
- Fate: Sold August 2001
- Name: Marine Star
- Owner: Nuku'alofa, Tonga
- Acquired: August 2001
- Fate: Sold September 2003
- Name: Noor
- Owner: United Maritime Services Inc
- Acquired: September 2003
- Fate: Sold September 2008
- Name: MV Dubai Moon
- Owner: ASM Shipping Inc, Panama
- Port of registry: Panama
- Acquired: September 2008
- Identification: IMO number: 7708649; Callsign: HPNK
- Fate: Sank on (or soon after) 21 May 2010 following cargo shifting in tropical storm; 12.150079°N 52.975131°E, approximately

General characteristics
- Tonnage: GRT 1599 tonnes (5786 following refit in USA in 2006)
- Length: 105.62 m
- Beam: 18.98 m
- Draught: 4.97 m
- Installed power: 4500 hp.
- Propulsion: 12MU453AK MaK diesel.
- Speed: 15.5 knots
- Crew: 23

MV Dubai Moon was a cargo ship which sank on (or soon after) May 21, 2010 due to strong waves caused by a tropical storm. The ship was carrying vehicles in the Gulf of Aden when she was struck by Cyclone Bandu, which pushed it off the track. The ship sent a distress call which was picked by Royal Navy frigate HMS Chatham. 23 crew members were rescued by the Westland Lynx helicopter from Chatham before Dubai Moon sank.

== Sinking ==
HMS Chatham's helicopter after successful rescue of the crew members

On May 20, 2010, HMS Chatham received a radio distress call from the master of MV Dubai Moon, Capt Hassan Madar. Capt Madar reported that his ship, which was transporting vehicles and 175 nautical miles (324 km) from Chatham, was caught in the Cyclone Bandu tropical storm and that the deck cargo had shifted causing the vessel to list 20 degrees in the extremely rough seas and winds of 70 mph (113 km/h).

At that time, the Panamanian-registered Dubai Moon was being blown towards the island of Abd al Kuri in the Gulf of Aden and there were fears that it would run aground on the island. Efforts to alter the ship's course caused it to list further and risked capsizing it. Chatham set course for the ship.

Dubai Moon missed the island and dropped her anchors early on 21 May to try to stop as she was approaching the island of Jazirat Samhah. Although the anchors did not hold they prevented the ship from hitting a reef.

Weather conditions improved during the day so that Chatham was able to launch her helicopter to rescue the entire crew of 23 over a period of three hours, and the ship sank after the rescue. In an interview following his rescue, Captain Madar explained that his ship had been operating further out to sea than normal to avoid Somalian pirates, and was consequently unable to seek shelter in the storm.
