= Tropical cyclones in 2010 =

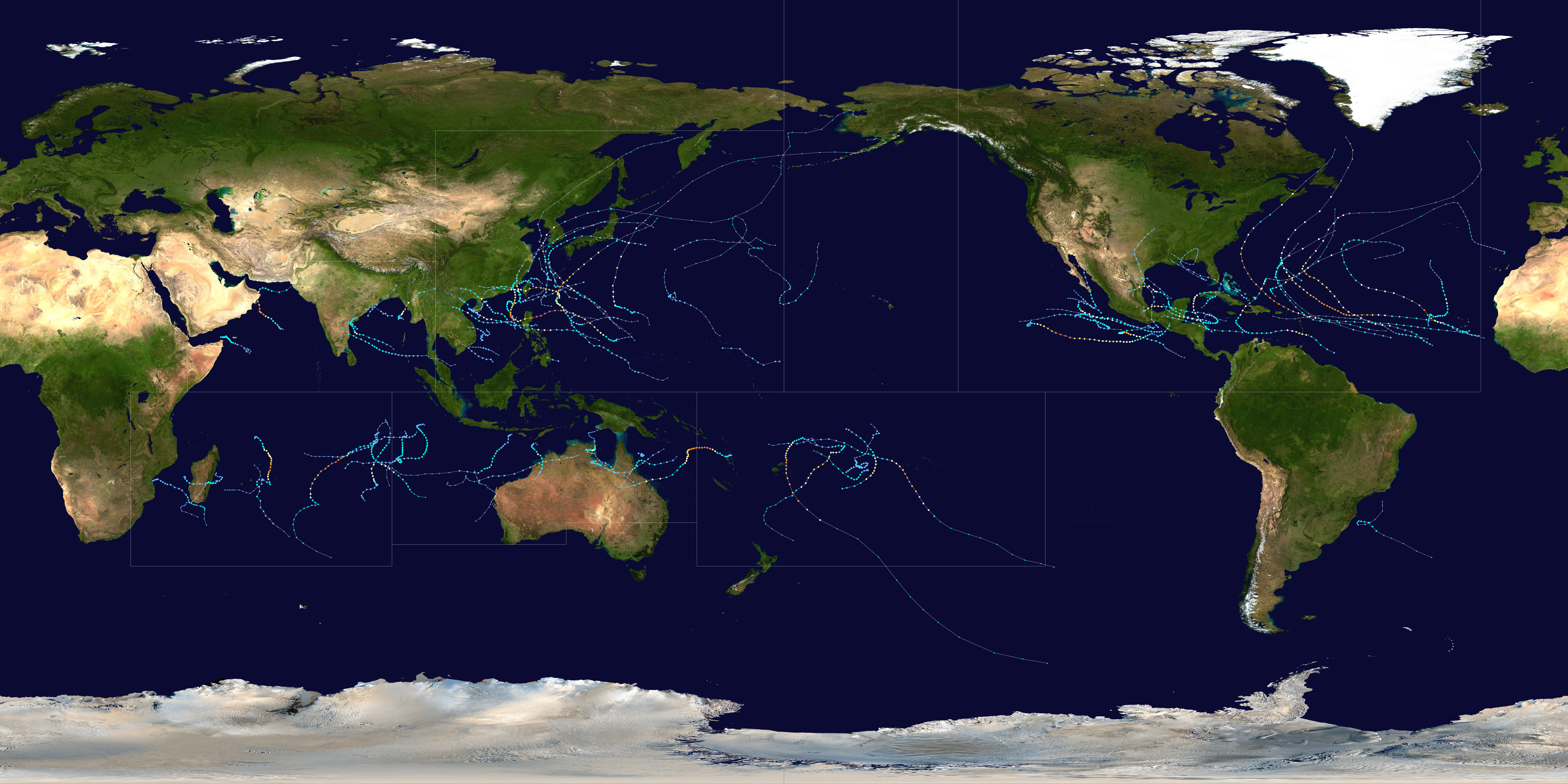
- Year summary map

Year boundaries
- First system: Edzani
- Formed: January 1, 2010
- Last system: 08U
- Dissipated: January 2, 2011

Strongest system
- Name: Megi
- Lowest pressure: 885 mbar (hPa); 26.13 inHg

Longest lasting system
- Name: Sarah
- Duration: 15 days

Year statistics
- Total systems: 109
- Named systems: 68
- Total fatalities: 1,553 total
- Total damage: $15.34 billion (2010 USD)
Related articles
- 2010 Atlantic hurricane season
- 2010 Pacific hurricane season
- 2010 Pacific typhoon season
- 2010 North Indian Ocean cyclone season
- 2009–10 South-West Indian Ocean cyclone season
- 2010–11 South-West Indian Ocean cyclone season
- 2009–10 Australian region cyclone season
- 2010–11 Australian region cyclone season
- 2009–10 South Pacific cyclone season
- 2010–11 South Pacific cyclone season

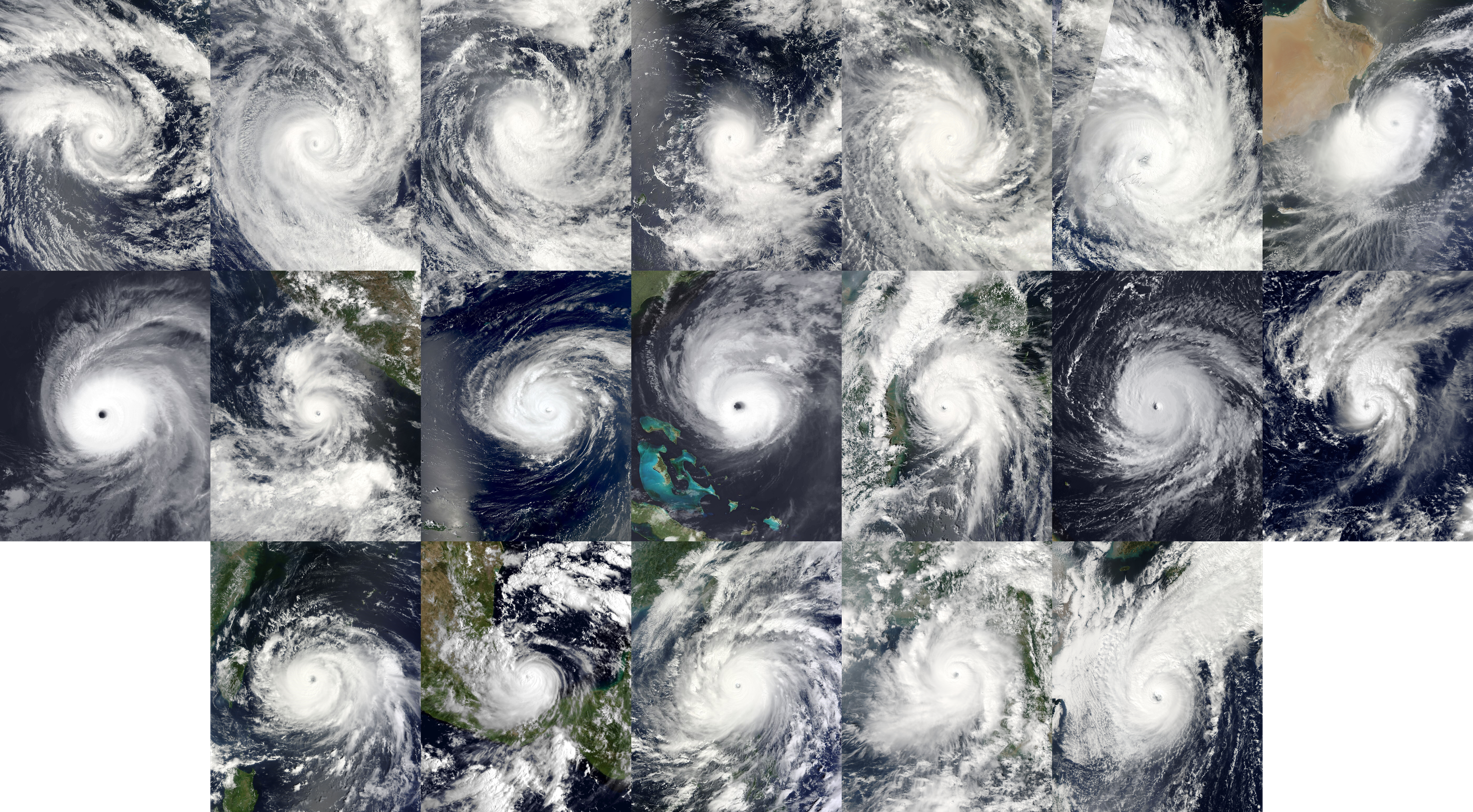
Satellite photos of the 19 tropical cyclones worldwide that reached at least Category 3 on the Saffir–Simpson scale during 2010, from Edzani in January to Chaba in October. Among them, Megi (center image on the final row) was the most intense, with a minimum central pressure of 885 hPa.

2010 was considered as one of the least active years for tropical cyclones on record, with only 64 named systems forming. During the year, tropical cyclones formed within seven different tropical cyclone basins, located within various parts of the Atlantic, Pacific and Indian Oceans. During the year, a total of 111 tropical cyclones developed, with 64 of them being named by either a Regional Specialized Meteorological Center (RSMC) or a Tropical Cyclone Warning Center (TCWC). The most active basin was the North Atlantic, which documented 19 named systems, while the North Indian Ocean, despite only amounting to five named systems, was its basin's most active since 1998. Conversely, both the West Pacific typhoon and East Pacific hurricane seasons experienced the fewest cyclones reaching tropical storm intensity in recorded history, numbering 14 and 8, respectively. Activity across the southern hemisphere's three basins—South-West Indian, Australian, and South Pacific—was spread evenly, with each region recording 7 named storms apiece. The southern hemisphere's strongest tropical cyclone was Cyclone Edzani, which bottomed out with a barometric pressure of 910 mbar (hPa; 26.87 inHg) in the South-West Indian Ocean. Nineteen Category 3 tropical cyclones formed, including four Category 5 tropical cyclones in the year. The accumulated cyclone energy (ACE) index for the 2010 (seven basins combined), as calculated by Colorado State University was 573.8 units.

The strongest of these tropical cyclones was Typhoon Megi, which strengthened to a minimum barometric pressure of 885 mbar (hPa; 26.13 inHg) before striking the east coast of Luzon in the Philippines. The costliest tropical cyclone in 2010 was Hurricane Karl, which struck the Veracruz, Mexico area in September, causing US$5.6 billion in damage. (Note: All damage figures are in their respective currency's 2010 value.) Hurricane Alex, Tropical Storm Matthew, and Tropical Storm Agatha were the only other tropical cyclones worldwide in 2010 to accrue over US$1 billion in damage. Agatha was also the year's deadliest storm, killing 190 people primarily in Guatemala after lasting for only one day over the waters of the East Pacific.

== Global atmospheric and hydrological conditions ==
The previous El Niño event broke down during the first quarter of 2010. The climate of the Pacific Ocean subsequently returned to neutral conditions by the end of April, while climate models used and developed by various meteorological agencies, subsequently started to show signs that a La Niña event would develop later in 2010. Over the next month the Pacific Ocean started to show various signals that indicated a La Niña event was developing and as a result, a La Niña watch was issued by the United States Climate Prediction Center during their June 2010 ENSO diagnostic discussion. As the ocean's surface temperature cooling progressed, more colder anomalies appeared at the International Date Line rather than over eastern Pacific, what made the event a Modoki La Nina.

== Systems ==
=== January ===
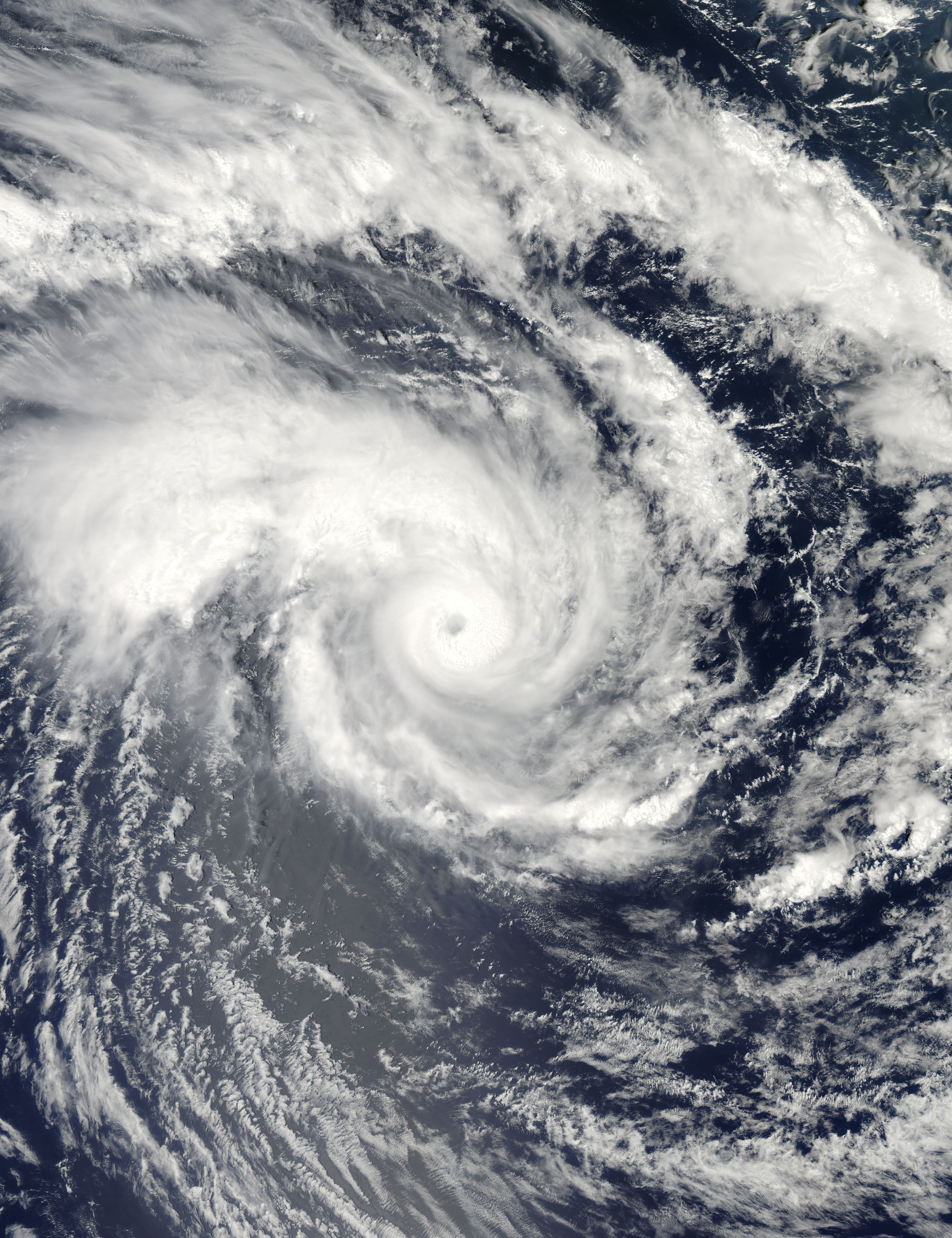
Cyclone Edzani

During the month of January, a total of twelve tropical cyclones formed, with only five receiving names by their meteorological agencies of responsibility. The most intense tropical cyclone of the month was Cyclone Edzani, peaking with 910 hPa and 150 mph in 10-minute sustained winds.

Tropical cyclones formed in January 2010
Storm name	Dates active	Max wind km/h (mph)	Pressure (hPa)	Areas affected	Damage (USD)	Deaths	Refs
Edzani	January 1–14	220 (140)	910	None	None	None	
03F	January 7–10	65 (40)	1002	French Polynesia, Southern Cook Islands	None	None	
04U	January 14–21	Unspecified	Unspecified	None	None	None	
09	January 15–16	45 (30)	1005	Réunion, Mauritius, Madagascar	Minimal	None	
Magda	January 18–24	130 (80)	975	Western Australia	Minimal	None	
01W	January 18–20	55 (35)	1006	Vietnam, Cambodia	$243 thousand	3	
Neville	January 19–21	65 (40)	995	Queensland	None	None	
Olga	January 20–30	95 (60)	983	Solomon Islands, Queensland, Northern Territory	Unknown	2	
05F	January 23–28	Not specified	997	None	None	None	
Subtropical Depression 10	January 25–31	65 (40)	995	None	None	None	
Nisha	January 27–31	75 (45)	990	Samoan Islands, Southern Cook Islands	None	None	
Oli	January 29 – February 7	185 (115)	925	Samoan Islands, Cook Islands, French Polynesia	$70 million	1	

=== February ===
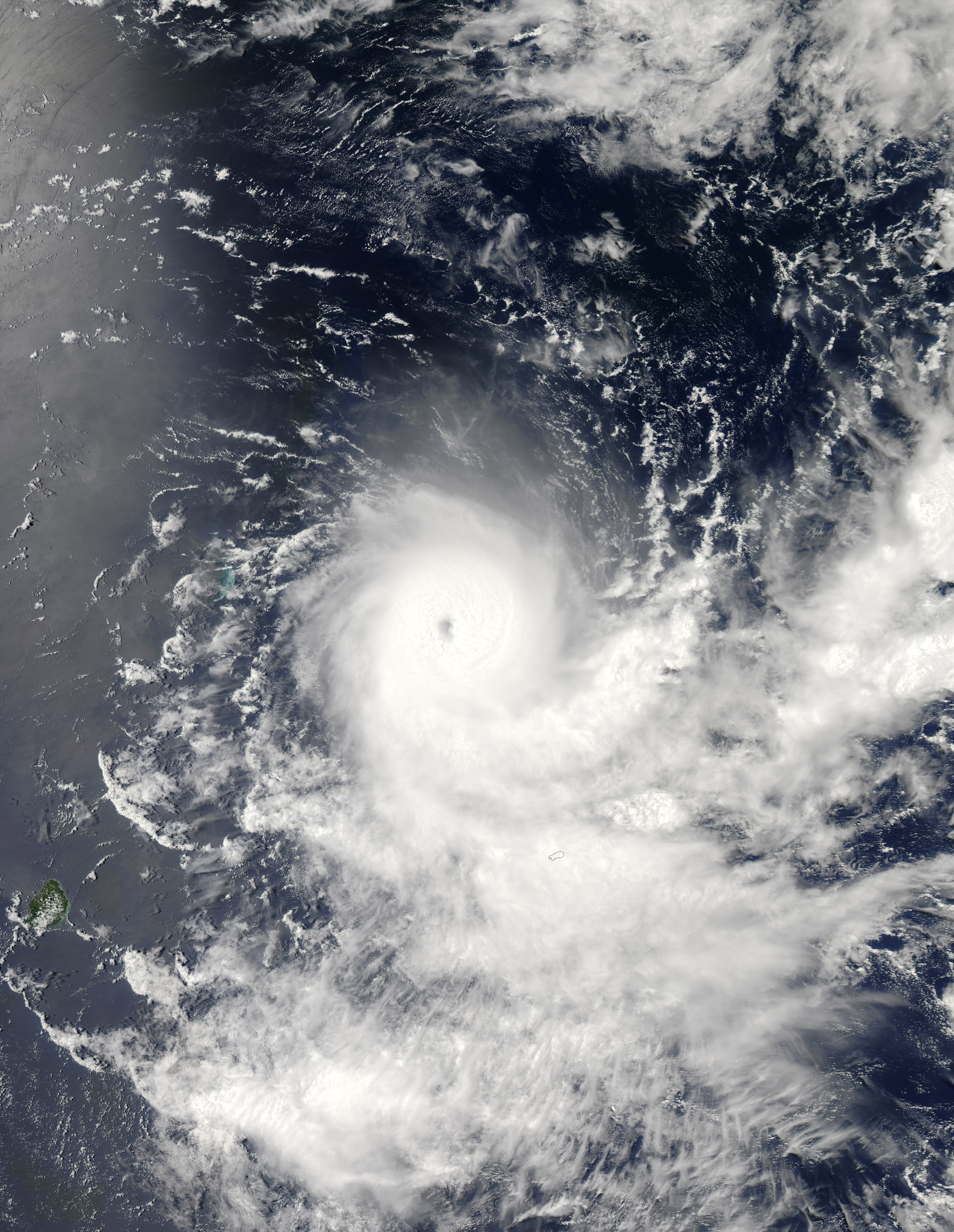
Cyclone Gelane

The month of February was quite inactive, with only seven tropical cyclones forming, with five becoming named storms. Cyclone Gelane was the most intense of the month, peaking at 930 hPa, along with 10-minute sustained winds of 125 mph. No one was killed by a tropical cyclone in the month.

Tropical cyclones formed in February 2010
Storm name	Dates active	Max wind km/h (mph)	Pressure (hPa)	Areas affected	Damage (USD)	Deaths	Refs
Fami	February 1 – 3	85 (50)	994	Madagascar	None	None	
08F	February 2 – 4	55 (35)	997	French Polynesia, Cook Islands	None	None	
Pat	February 6 – 11	140 (85)	960	Cook Islands	$13.7 million	None	
Rene	February 9 – 17	155 (100)	955	Samoan Islands, Tonga	$18 million	None	
08U	February 22 – 24	Not specified	Not specified	Northern Territory	None	None	
Gelane	February 15 – 22	205 (125)	930	Reunion, Mauritius, Rodrigues, Madagascar	None	None	
Sarah	February 17 – March 3	65 (40)	995	Cook Islands	Unknown	None	

=== March ===
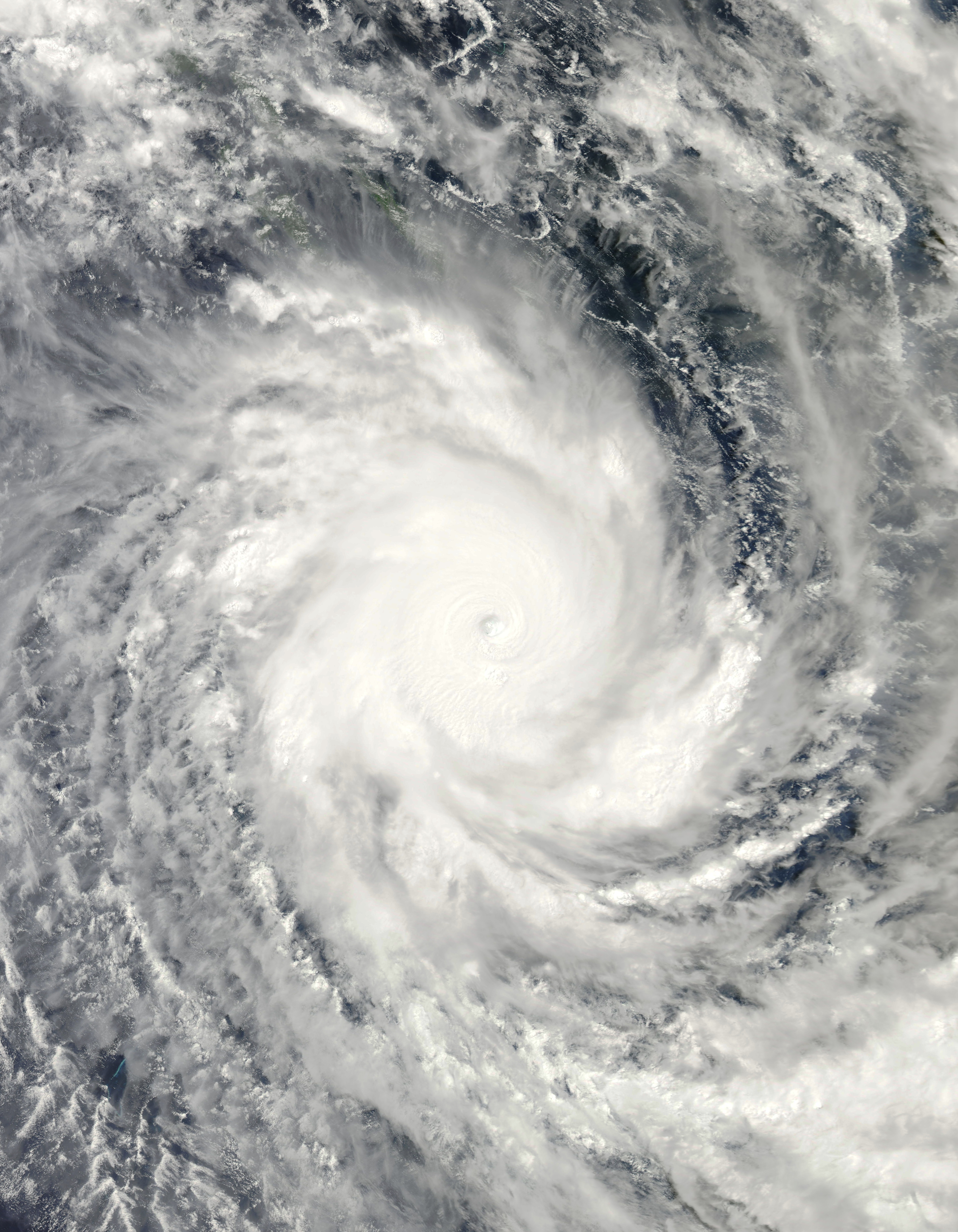
Cyclone Ului

March was somewhat active with eight tropical cyclones forming with seven receiving names. Cyclone Ului was the most intense for March, as it was one of the fastest intensifying tropical cyclones on record. Ului was a Category 5 tropical cyclone (in 1-minute sustained winds) for a near-record breaking 30 hours. When Ului made landfall in Queensland, Brisbane, damages totaled to be US$72 million ($100 million AUD)

Tropical cyclones formed in March 2010
Storm name	Dates active	Max wind km/h (mph)	Pressure (hPa)	Areas affected	Damage (USD)	Deaths	Refs
Hubert	March 7 – 15	100 (65)	985	Madagascar	Unknown	85	
Anita	March 8 – 12	85 (50)	995	Brazil	None	None	
Ului	March 9 – 21	215 (130)	915	Queensland	$72 million	1	
Tomas	March 9 – 17	185 (115)	925	Wallis and Futuna, Fiji	$45 million	3	
Imani	March 20–27	130 (80)	965	None	None	None	
Omais (Agaton)	March 22–26	65 (40)	998	Woleai, Fais, Ulithi, Yap	$10 thousand	None	
Paul	March 22 – April 3	130 (80)	971	Northern Territory	Unknown	None	
15F	March 30 – April 5	55 (35)	999	None	None	None	

=== April ===
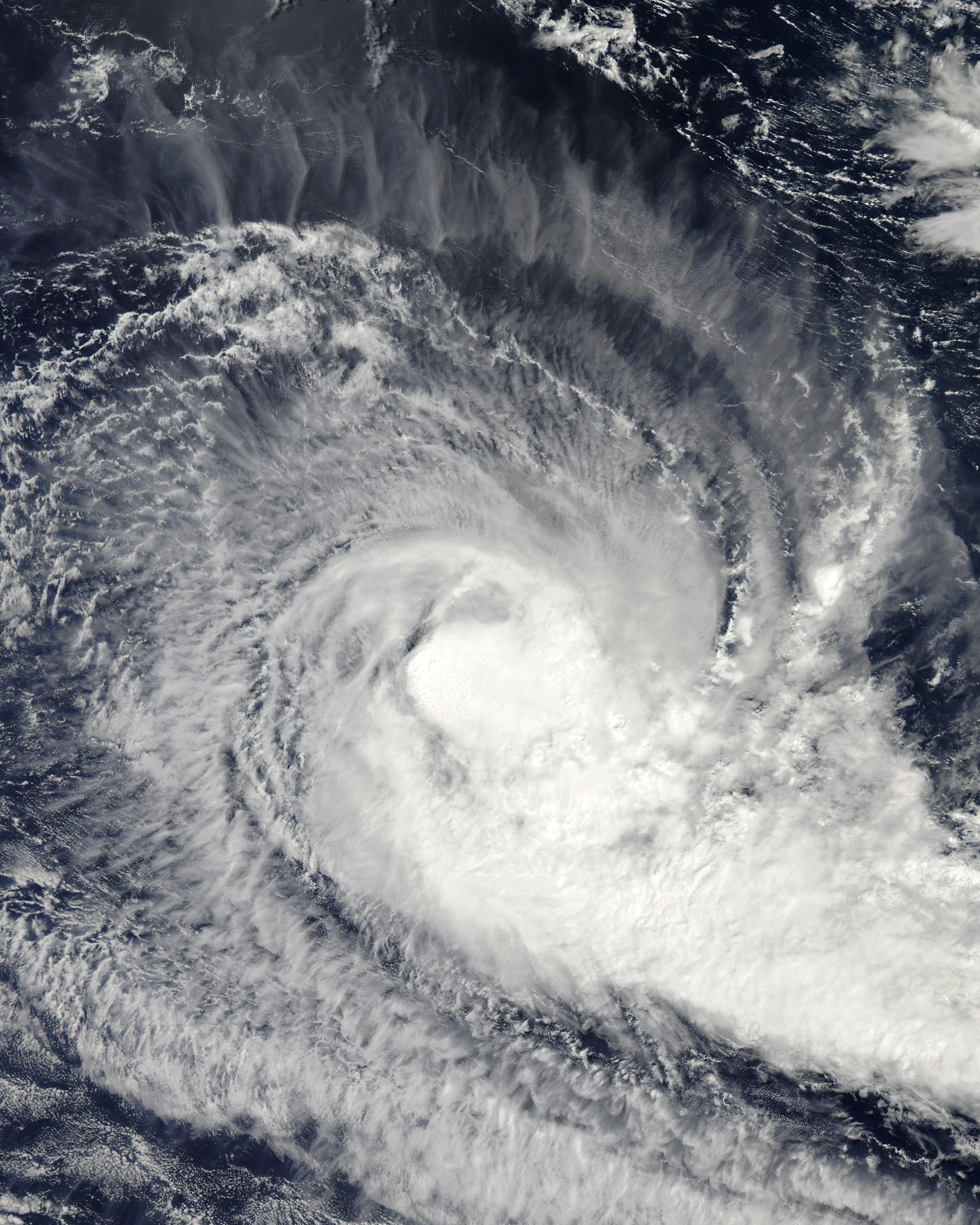
Cyclone Robyn

April was an unusually inactive month with only three tropical cyclones forming and two of them being named. No tropical cyclones attained pressure less than 980 hPa, which makes Cyclone Robyn the most intense of the month, attaining that intensity, as well as 10-minute sustained winds of 70 miles per hour. No deaths occurred during this month.

Tropical cyclones formed in April 2010
Storm name	Dates active	Max wind km/h (mph)	Pressure (hPa)	Areas affected	Damage (USD)	Deaths	Refs
Robyn	April 1 – 7	110 (70)	980	None	None	None	
Sean	April 22 – 25	100 (65)	988	Northern Territory	Unknown	None	
TD	April 26	Not specified	1008	Mindanao	None	None	

=== May ===
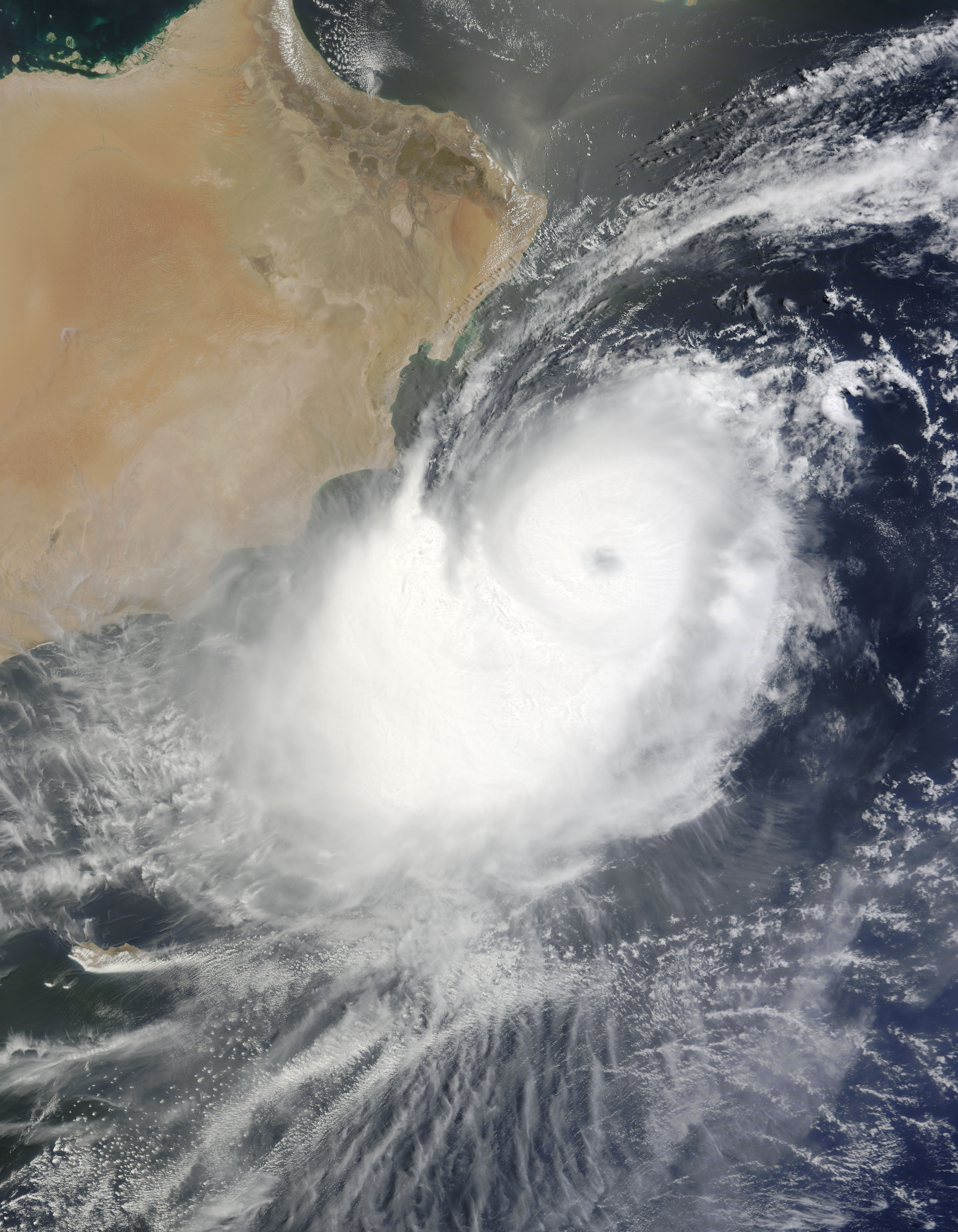
Cyclone Phet

May was a relatively inactive month with five tropical cyclones forming and all five received names. Tropical Storm Agatha was the deadliest and costliest of the month, killing around 204 people and inflicting $1.11 billion in damage. Cyclone Phet was the most intense tropical cyclone in the month. As Category 4 tropical cyclone on the Saffir–Simpson Hurricane Wind Scale (SSHWS), Phet was one of the least intense for that category on record, with a high pressure of 964 hPa. Phet attained 3-minute sustained winds of 100 MPH.

Tropical cyclones formed in May 2010
Storm name	Dates active	Max wind km/h (mph)	Pressure (hPa)	Areas affected	Damage (USD)	Deaths	Refs
Laila	May 17 – 21	100 (65)	986	India	$118 million	65	
Bandu	May 19 – 23	75 (45)	994	Yemen, Somalia	None	1	
Joël	May 22 – 29	100 (65)	990	Madagascar Mozambique	None	None	
Agatha	May 29 – 30	75 (45)	1001	Mexico, Guatemala	$1.11 billion	204	
Phet	May 30 – June 7	155 (100)	964	Oman, Pakistan, India	$780 million	44	

=== June ===
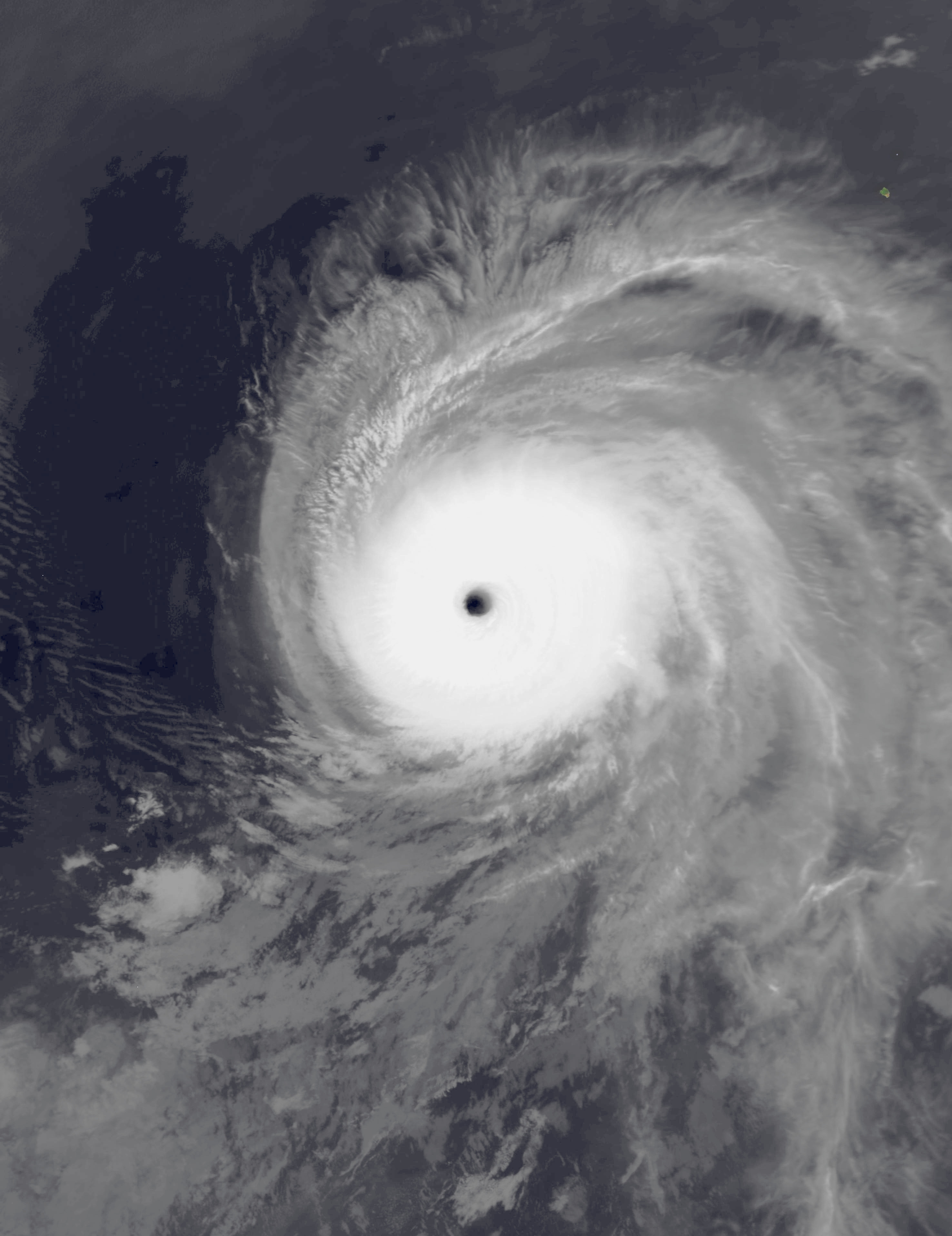
Hurricane Celia

June was relatively inactive with only six systems forming all within the northern hemisphere, with four further developing into tropical storms and receiving names. Hurricane Celia was the strongest and most intense tropical cyclone of the month which became a Category 5 hurricane on the Saffir–Simpson hurricane wind scale; the first Category 5 in the month of June in the Eastern Pacific basin since Ava in 1973. Hurricane Alex is tied with 1957's Hurricane Audrey as the most intense hurricane in the month of June on record in the Atlantic, peaking at 946 hPa.

Tropical cyclones formed in June 2010
Storm name	Dates active	Max wind km/h (mph)	Pressure (hPa)	Areas affected	Damage (USD)	Deaths	Refs
TD	June 3–5	Not specified	1002	None	None	None	
Two-E	June 16–17	55 (35)	1007	Mexico	Minimal	None	
Blas	June 17–21	100 (65)	994	None	None	None	
Celia	June 18–28	260 (160)	921	Mexico, Clipperton Island	None	None	
Darby	June 23–28	195 (120)	959	Mexico	None	None	
Alex	June 25 – July 2	175 (110)	946	Greater Antilles, Belize, Yucatán Peninsula, Northern Mexico, Texas	$1.52 billion	33	

=== July ===
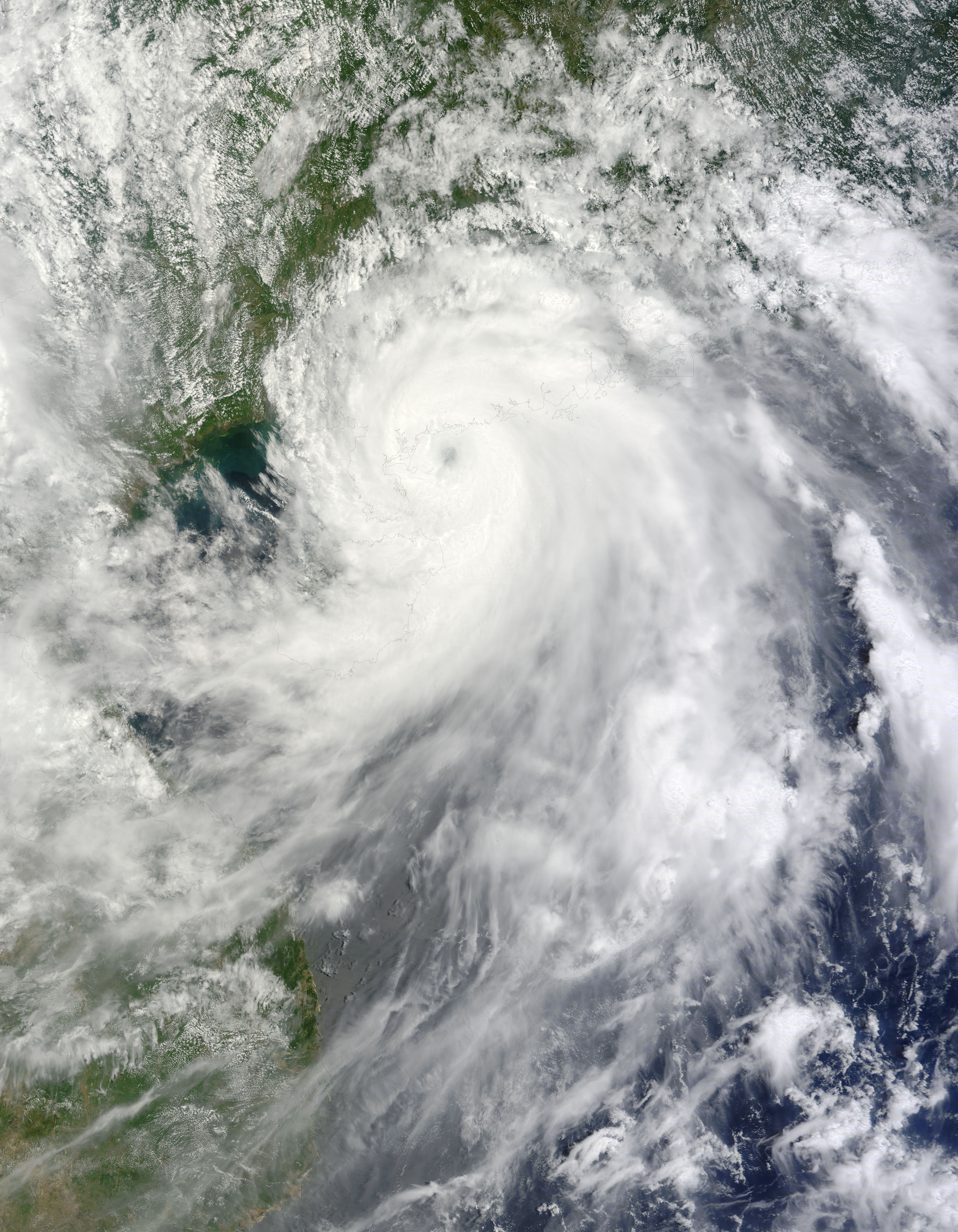
Typhoon Chanthu

July was a very inactive month and the least active July on record for any given year, with only eight tropical cyclones forming, three of which becoming named tropical storms. Only two reached hurricane strength, with no major-hurricane equivalent tropical cyclones. Typhoon Chanthu was the most intense tropical cyclone in the month, with a minimum pressure of 965 hPa, and 10-minute sustained winds of 80 mph.

Tropical cyclones formed in July 2010
Storm name	Dates active	Max wind km/h (mph)	Pressure (hPa)	Areas affected	Damage (USD)	Deaths	Refs
Two	July 8–9	55 (35)	1005	Northern Mexico, South Texas	Minimal	None	
Conson (Basyang)	July 11–18	130 (80)	975	Philippines China, Vietnam	$82 million	106	
Six-E	July 14–16	55 (35)	1006	Mexico	None	None	
Chanthu (Caloy)	July 17–23	130 (80)	965	Philippines China	$818 million	19	
TD	July 18–20	55 (35)	1004	Japan	None	None	
Bonnie	July 22–24	75 (45)	1005	Puerto Rico, Hispaniola, Turks and Caicos Islands, The Bahamas, Florida	$1.36 million	1	
TD	July 23–24	Not specified	1008	Taiwan	None	None	
TD	July 26–28	55 (35)	1002	China	None	None	

=== August ===
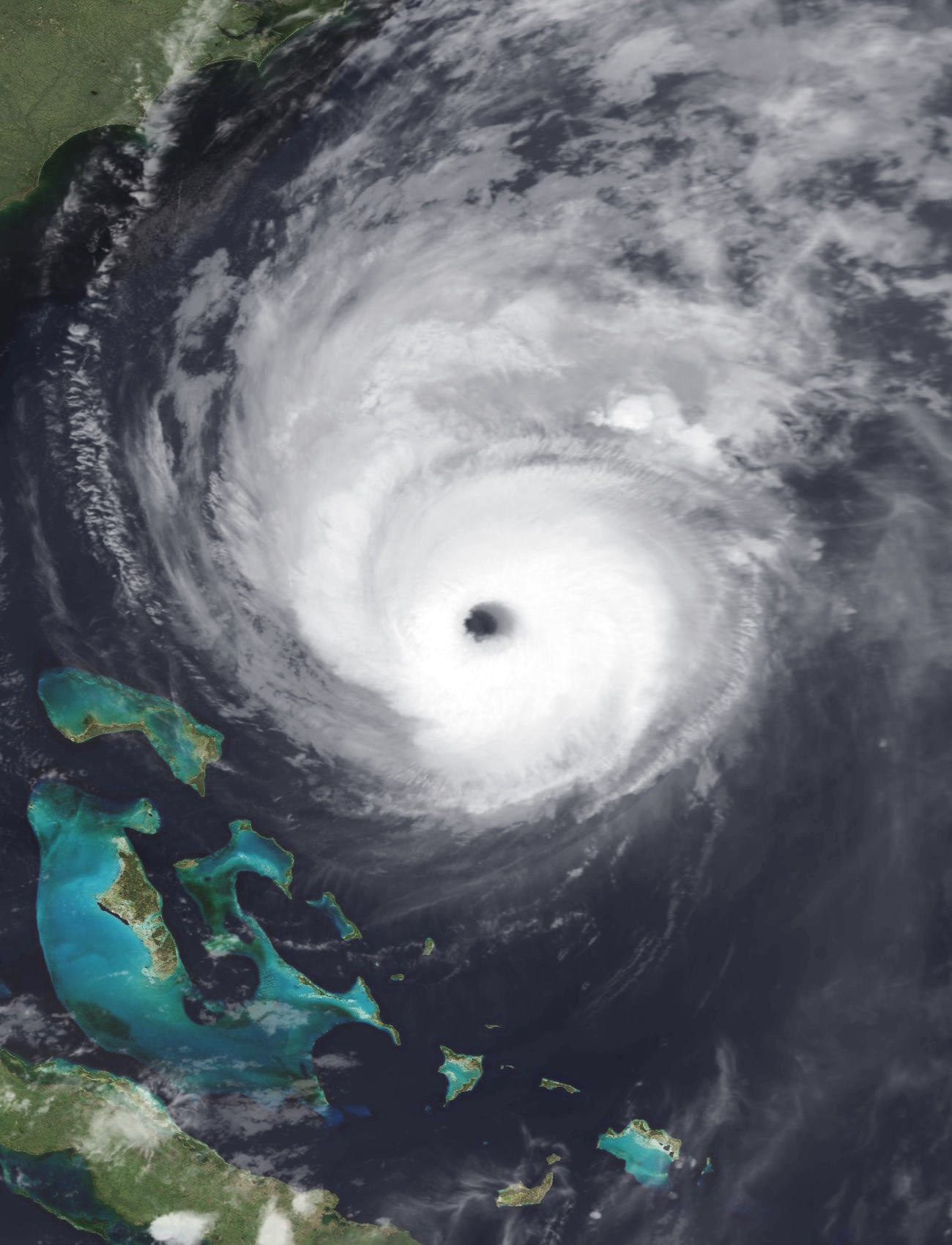
Hurricane Earl

August was above average, featuring 16 systems with 12 of them being named. The strongest storm was Hurricane Earl, with a minimum pressure of 927 hPa, and 1-minute sustained winds of 145 MPH.

Tropical cyclones formed in August 2010
Storm name	Dates active	Max wind km/h (mph)	Pressure (hPa)	Areas affected	Damage (USD)	Deaths	Refs
Colin	August 2–8	60 (95)	1005	Leeward Islands, Bermuda, Carolinas, New England	Minimal	1	
Domeng	August 3–5	40 (65)	997	Philippines	Minimal	3	
Dianmu (Ester)	August 6–12	95 (60)	985	South Korea, Japan	$42 million	37	
Estelle	August 6–10	100 (65)	994	Mexico	None	None	
Five	August 10–11	55 (35)	1007	Gulf Coast of the United States	$1 million	None	
Eight-E	August 20–21	55 (35)	1003	None	None	None	
Frank	August 21–28	150 (90)	978	Mexico	$8.3 million	6	
Danielle	August 21–30	215 (130)	942	Bermuda, East Coast of the United States	Minimal	2	
Mindulle	August 22–25	85 (50)	985	Vietnam	$43.3 million	10	
Earl	August 25 – September 4	230 (145)	927	Leeward Islands, Puerto Rico, The Bahamas, Eastern United States, Atlantic Canada, Quebec	$45 million	5	
TD	August 26–28	55 (35)	1004	None	None	None	
Lionrock (Florita)	August 27 – September 4	95 (60)	985	Philippines Taiwan, China	$65.1 million	None	
Kompasu (Glenda)	August 28 – September 2	150 (90)	960	China, Korea	$58.3 million	29	
Namtheun	August 29–31	65 (40)	996	Taiwan, China	None	None	
Fiona	August 30 – September 3	100 (65)	998	Leeward Islands, Bermuda	Minimal	None	
TD	August 30–31	55 (35)	1008	None	None	None	

=== September ===
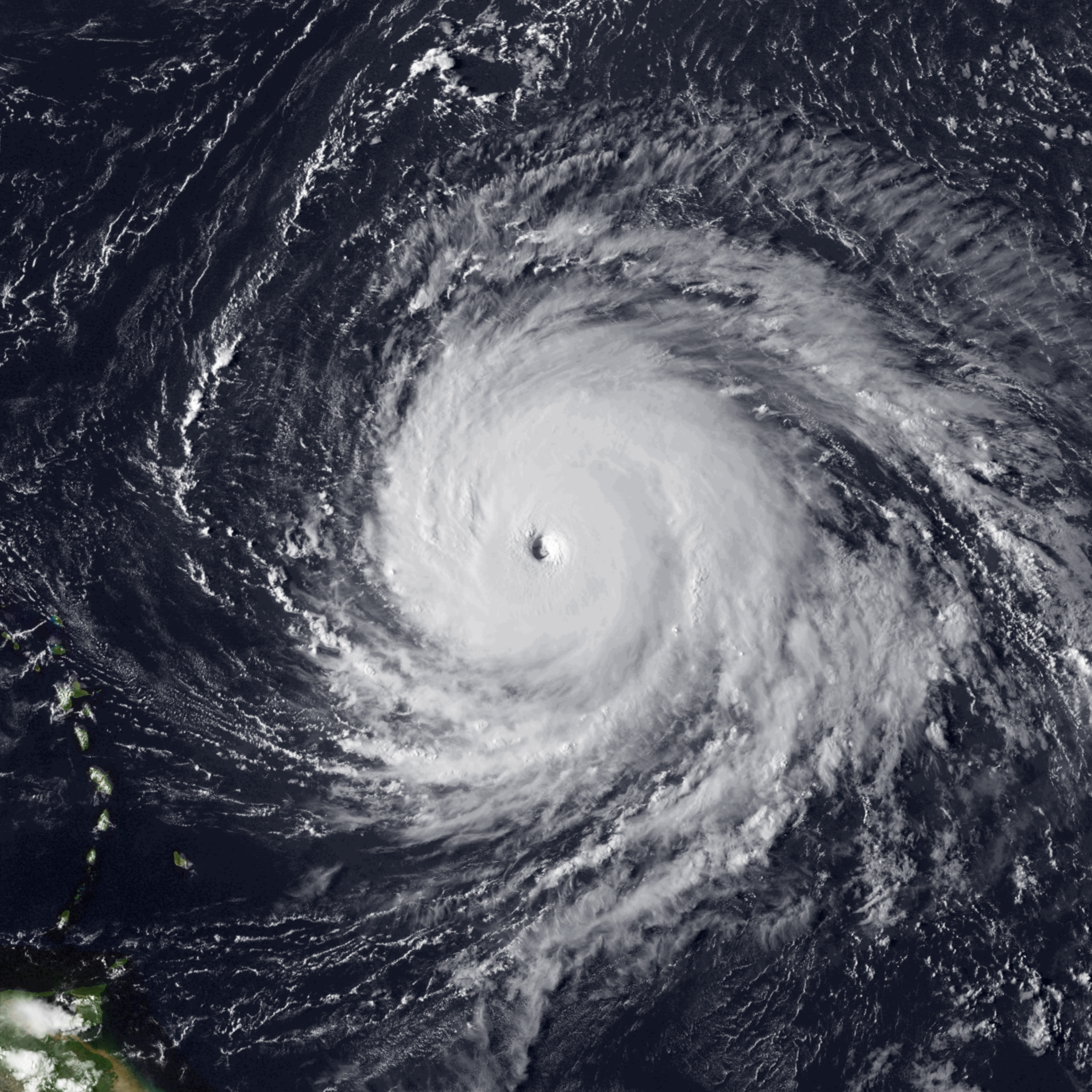
Hurricane Igor

September was fairly-above average, featuring 15 storms, with 13 of them being named. Igor was the strongest system, with a minimum pressure of 924 hPa and 1-minute sustained winds of 155 MPH.

Tropical cyclones formed in September 2010
Storm name	Dates active	Max wind km/h (mph)	Pressure (hPa)	Areas affected	Damage (USD)	Deaths	Refs
Malou (Henry)	September 1–10	95 (60)	985	Japan	Unknown	None	
Gaston	September 1–2	65 (40)	1005	Leeward Islands, Puerto Rico	None	None	
Ten-E	September 3–4	55 (35)	1003	None	None	None	
Eleven-E	September 3–4	55 (35)	1004	Mexico, Central America	$500 million	None	
Hermine	September 5–9	110 (70)	989	Central America, Mexico, Texas Oklahoma, Kansas	$740 million	52	
Meranti	September 7–10	100 (65)	985	Taiwan, China	$118 million	3	
Georgette	September 20–23	65 (40)	999	Baja California Peninsula, Mexico	Minimal	None	
Igor	September 8–21	250 (155)	924	Cape Verde, Leeward Islands, Bermuda, East Coast of the United States, Newfoundland and Labrador	$200 million	4	
Julia	September 12–20	220 (140)	948	Cape Verde	Minimal	None	
Fanapi (Inday)	September 14–21	175 (110)	935	Taiwan, China	$1 billion	105	
Karl	September 14–18	205 (125)	956	Belize, Yucatán Peninsula, Veracruz	$3.9 billion	22	
Malakas	September 20–25	155 (100)	945	Japan	None	None	
Lisa	September 20–26	140 (85)	982	None	None	None	
Matthew	September 23–26	95 (60)	998	Venezuela, Jamaica, Central America, Mexico	$172.2 million	126	
Nicole	September 28–29	75 (45)	995	Cayman Islands, Jamaica, Cuba, The Bahamas, Florida, East Coast of the United States	$245.4 million	16	

=== October ===
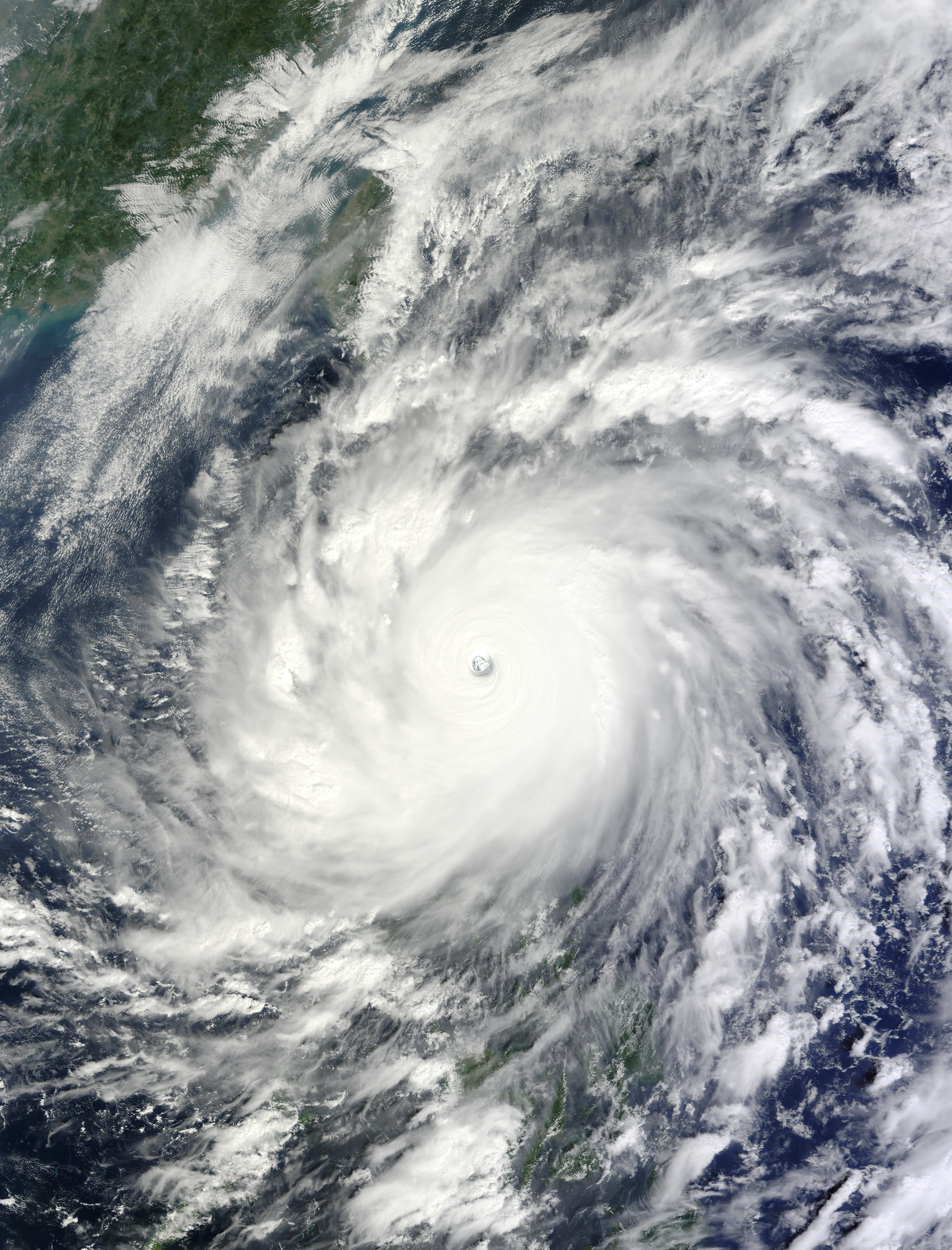
Typhoon Megi

October was slightly-below average, featuring 15 storms, with 9 of them being named. October featured Typhoon Megi, the strongest storm of the year, with a minimum pressure of 885 hPa and 10-minute sustained winds of 145 MPH.

Tropical cyclones formed in October 2010
Storm name	Dates active	Max wind km/h (mph)	Pressure (hPa)	Areas affected	Damage (USD)	Deaths	Refs
14W	October 5–10	55 (35)	1006	China	None	None	
Otto	October 6–10	140 (85)	976	Leeward Islands, Virgin Islands, Puerto Rico	$22.5 million	None	
TD	October 7–8	Not specified	1012	None	None	None	
BOB 02	October 7 –9	45 (30)	996	India, Bangladesh	Minimal	17	
Paula	October 11–16	165 (105)	981	Honduras, Nicaragua, Mexico, Cuba, The Bahamas, Florida	Unknown	1	
Megi (Juan)	October 12–24	230 (145)	885	Philippines, Taiwan, China	$709 million	69	
BOB 03	October 13–16	65 (40)	995	India	Minimal	None	
Richard	October 20–26	155 (100)	977	Central America	$80 million	1	
Giri	October 20–23	195 (120)	950	Bangladesh Myanmar, Thailand, Yunnan	$359 million	157	
17W	October 20–27	55 (35)	1004	None	None	None	
Chaba (Katring)	October 20–31	175 (110)	935	Japan	Minimal	None	
01	October 25—29	55 (35)	997	None	None	None	
Shary	October 28–30	120 (75)	989	Bermuda	Minimal	None	
Anggrek	October 28 – November 4	74 (45)	995	Cocos (Keeling) Islands	None	None	
Tomas	October 29 — November 7	155 (100)	982	Windward Islands, Leeward Islands, Greater Antilles, Lucayan Archipelago	$463.4 million	51	

=== November ===
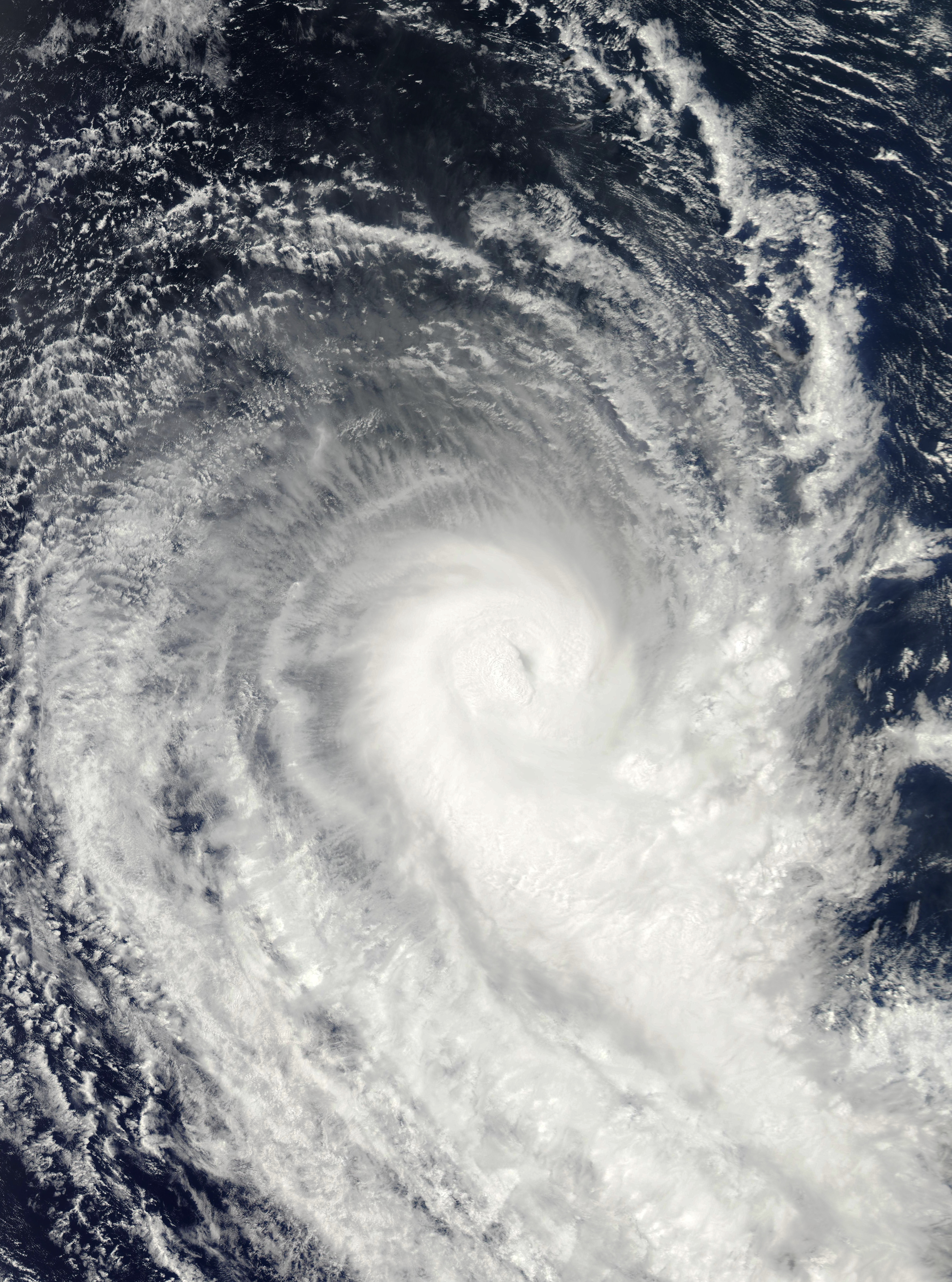
Cyclone Abele

November was extremely inactive, featuring 5 storms and only 2 named storms. Due to this inactivity, Cyclone Abele was the strongest of the month, with a minimum barometric pressure of 974 hPa and 10-minute sustained winds of 80 MPH.

Tropical cyclones formed in November 2010
Storm name	Dates active	Max wind km/h (mph)	Pressure (hPa)	Areas affected	Damage (USD)	Deaths	Refs
Jal	November 1–8	110 (70)	988	Thailand, Malaysia, Andaman Islands, India	$392 million	117	
TD	November 3–4	55 (35)	1006	Vietnam	None	None	
18W	November 12–14	55 (35)	1004	Vietnam, Laos, Thailand	Unknown	None	
01F	November 24–30	65 (40)	999	Vanuatu, Fiji	None	None	
Abele	November 28 — December 4	130 (80)	974	None	None	None	

=== December ===
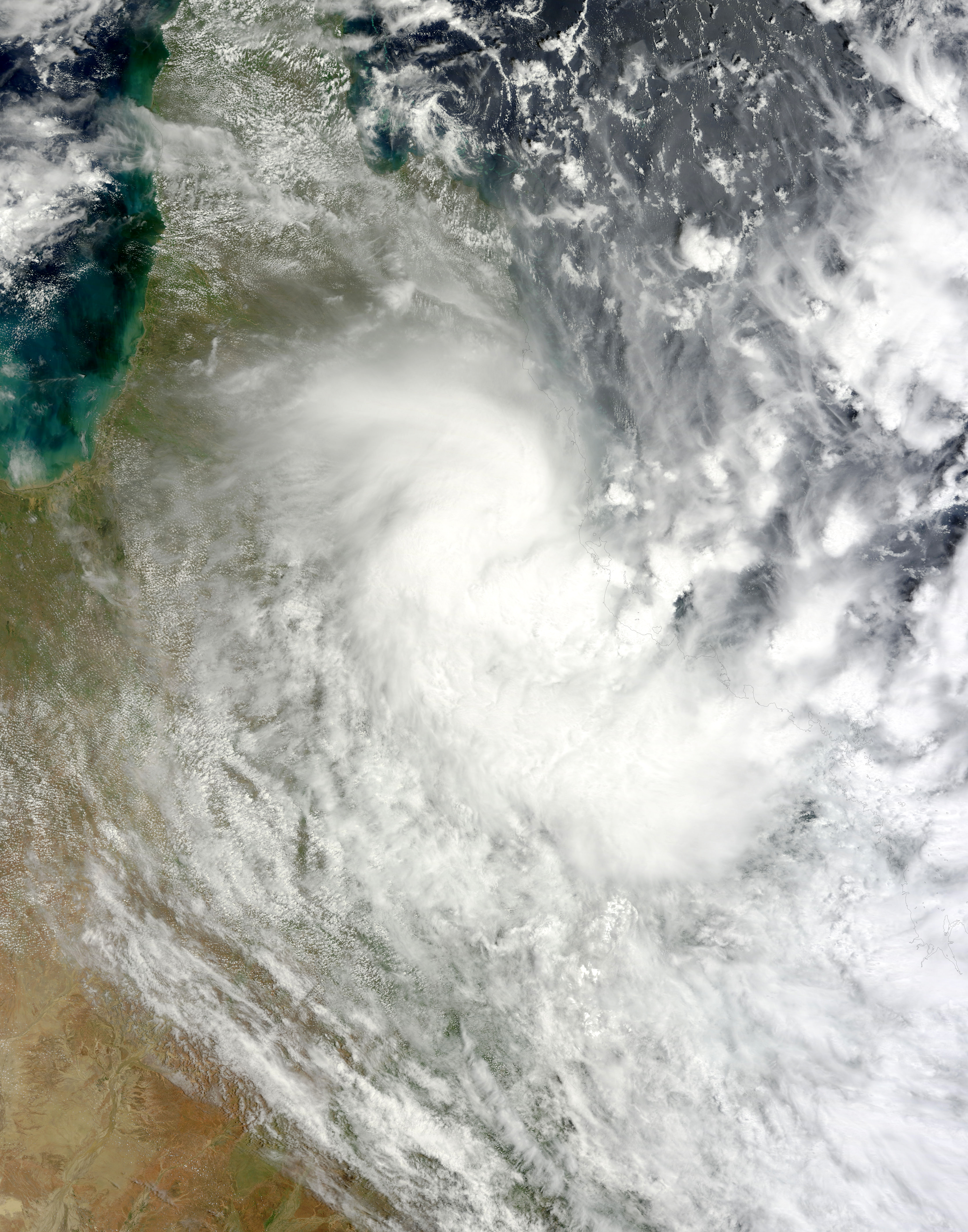
Cyclone Tasha

December was somewhat active, however, it was very inactive in terms of named systems, with only two of the ten tropical cyclones forming, Omeka and Tasha, getting named. The month started off extremely late on December 20th, with both Omeka and Tasha forming, the latter becoming the most intense cyclone this month, with a minimum pressure of only 993hPa.

Tropical cyclones formed in December 2010
Storm names	Dates active	Max wind km/h (mph)	Pressure (hPa)	Areas affected	Damage (USD)	Deaths	Refs
BOB 06	December 7 –8	45 (30)	1000	India	Minimal	None	
19W	December 12–13	55 (35)	1002	Vietnam	None	None	
03U	December 15–20	65 (40)	989	Western Australia	$77 million	None	
Omeka	December 20–21	85 (50)	997	Hawaii	None	None	
Tasha	December 20–25	75 (45)	993	Queensland	Unknown	1	
05U	December 22–24	Not specified	Not specified	None	None	None	
06U	December 30 – January 2	55 (35)	993	Northern Territory, Western Australia	None	None	
07U	December 30 – January 2	Not specified	Not specified	None	None	None	
02F	December 31 – January 2	Not specified	1004	None	None	None	
08U	December 31 – January 2	Not specified	Not specified	None	None	None	

== Global effects ==
There are a total of seven tropical cyclone basins that tropical cyclones typically form in this table, data from all these basins are added.

Season name		Areas affected	Systems formed	Named storms	Hurricane-force tropical cyclones	Damage (2010 USD)	Deaths	Ref.
North Atlantic Ocean (Note: The wind speeds for this tropical cyclone/basin are based on the Saffir Simpson Scale which uses 1-minute sustained winds.)		Greater Antilles, Central America, Yucatán Peninsula, Northern Mexico, Leeward Islands, Bermuda, East Coast of the United States, Cabo Verde, Eastern Mexico, Central America, Windward Islands, Leeward Antilles, Lucayan Archipelago	20	18	12	~$7.39 billion	315 (77)	
Eastern and Central Pacific Ocean		Northwestern Mexico, Southwestern Mexico, Central America, Clipperton Island, Hawaii	12	9	3	$1.62 billion	210 (58)	
Western Pacific Ocean (Note: Only systems that formed either before or on December 31, 2010 are counted in the seasonal totals.)		Vietnam, Cambodia, Woleai, Fais, Ulithi, Yap, Mindanao, Philippines, South China, Japan, Taiwan, Northern Luzon, South Korea, East China, Laos, Thailand	29	15	9	$2.95 billion	384	
North Indian Ocean (Note: The wind speeds for this tropical cyclone/basin are based on the IMD Scale which uses 3-minute sustained winds.)		India, Somalia, Yemen, Oman, Pakistan, Bangladesh, Myanmar, Thailand, Yunnan, Malaysia, Andaman Islands	8	5	3	$3.07 billion	414	
South-West Indian Ocean	January – June (Note: Only systems that formed either on or after January 1, 2010 are counted in the seasonal totals.) (Note: The wind speeds for this tropical cyclone are based on Météo-France, which uses wind gusts.)	Reunion, Mauritius, Madagascar, Mauritius, Rodrigues	8	5	1	Unknown	85	
South-West Indian Ocean	July – December	—N/a	2	1	1	—N/a	—N/a	
Australian region	January – June	Western Australia, Eastern Indonesia, Top End, Kimberley, Queensland, Papua New Guinea, Cocos (Keeling) Islands	8	6	3	—N/a	2	
Australian region	July – December	Cocos (Keeling) Islands, Western Australia, Queensland, Northern Territory	6	1	—N/a	$77 million	1	
South Pacific Ocean	January – June	French Polynesia, Southern Cook Islands, Solomon Islands, Samoan Islands, Tonga, Vanuatu, Wallis and Futuna, Fiji	12	8	5	$226.7 million	7	
South Pacific Ocean	July – December	Vanuatu, Fiji	2	—N/a	—N/a	—N/a	—N/a	
South Atlantic Ocean		Brazil	2	1	—N/a	Unknown	—N/a	
Worldwide		(See above)	109 (Note: The sum of the number of systems in each basin will not equal the number shown as the total. This is because when systems move between basins, it creates a discrepancy in the actual number of systems.)	68	37	$15.34 billion	1,418 (135)	

== See also ==
- Tropical cyclones by year
- List of earthquakes in 2010
- Tornadoes of 2010

== Notes ==
^{5}All storms occurring outside of 2010 are not counted in the death and damage figures
