= Cyclone Phet =

North Indian cyclone in 2010

Very Severe Cyclonic Storm Phet
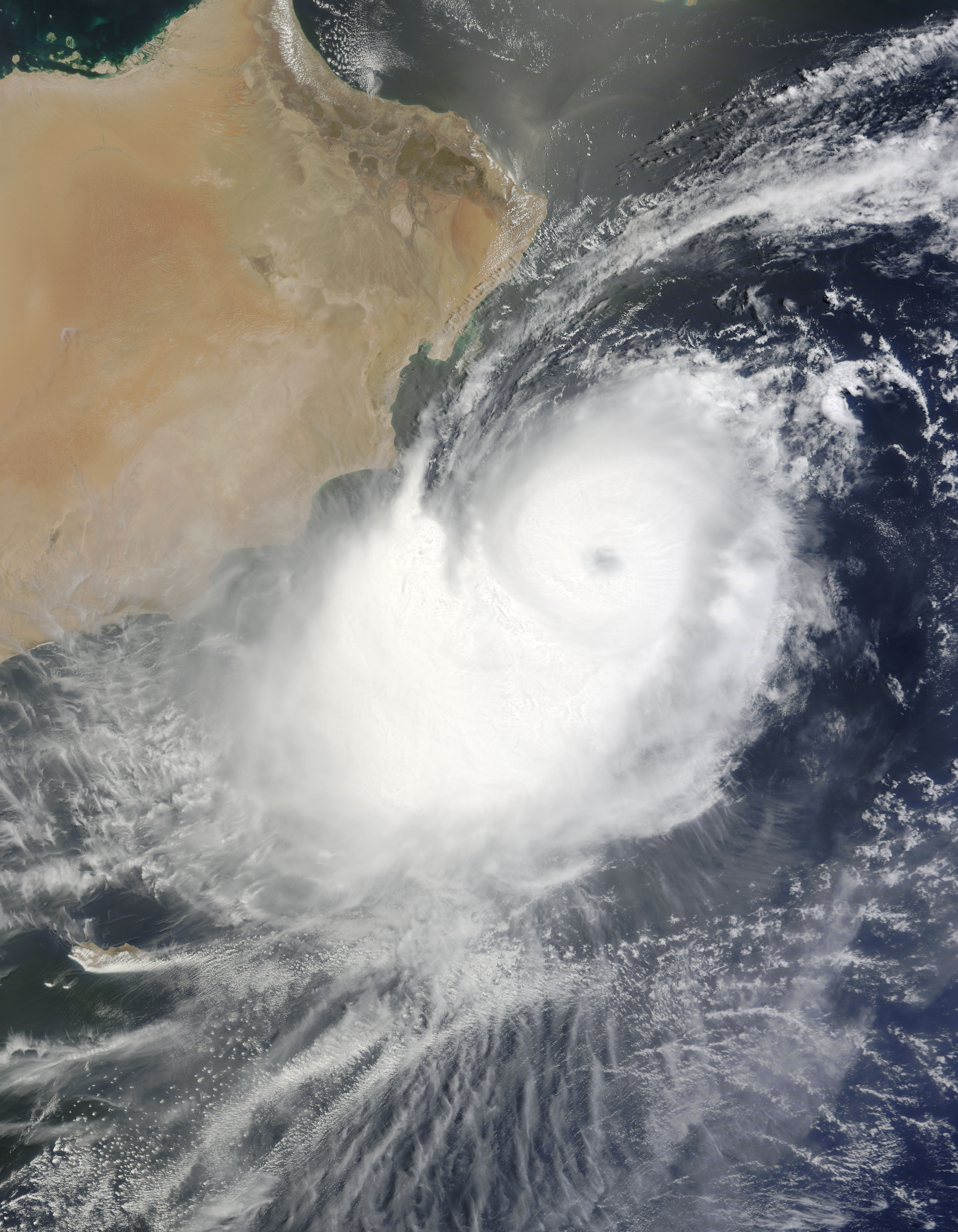
- Cyclone Phet near peak intensity on 2 June

Meteorological history
- Formed: 31 May 2010
- Dissipated: 7 June 2010

Very severe cyclonic storm
- 3-minute sustained (IMD)
- Highest winds: 155 km/h (100 mph)
- Lowest pressure: 964 hPa (mbar); 28.47 inHg

Category 4-equivalent tropical cyclone
- 1-minute sustained (SSHWS)
- Highest winds: 230 km/h (145 mph)
- Lowest pressure: 929 hPa (mbar); 27.43 inHg

Overall effects
- Fatalities: 47 total
- Damage: >$861 million (2010 USD)
- Areas affected: Oman, Pakistan, India
- IBTrACS
- Part of the 2010 North Indian Ocean cyclone season

Very Severe Cyclonic Storm Phet (Note: The name Phet (Thai: เพชร, [pʰet̚˦˥]) was contributed by Thailand and means "diamond" in Thai.) was a powerful tropical cyclone that made landfall on Oman, Western India, and Pakistan. The third named cyclone of the 2010 cyclone season, Phet developed in the Arabian Sea on 31 May to the west of India. With conducive environmental conditions, the storm intensified to reach peak sustained winds of 155 km/h (95 mph) on 2 June, based on analysis by the India Meteorological Department (IMD). On the next day, Phet dropped heavy rainfall while moving across eastern Oman, with a peak of 603 mm (23.7 in) in Qurayyat. The rains flooded arid areas and collected into wadis – normally dry river beds. Thousands of homes were wrecked across Oman. There were 24 fatalities in the country, and damage was estimated at US$780 million.

After exiting Oman on 4 June, Phet turned to the northeast and later to the east while continuing to weaken. The residual thunderstorms spread ahead of the circulation over Pakistan, producing 370 mm (15 in) of rainfall at Gwadar. In the city, the storm washed away houses and flooded the port, On June 6, Phet moved ashore the country near Karachi, a city of 16 million people, where several neighborhoods were flooded and power outages lasted over 12 hours. Across Pakistan, the storm killed 16 people and left $81 million in damage. Phet continued into western India, where it degenerated into a remnant low-pressure area. In the country, storm rainfall killed five people, as well as dozens of animals.

== Meteorological history ==
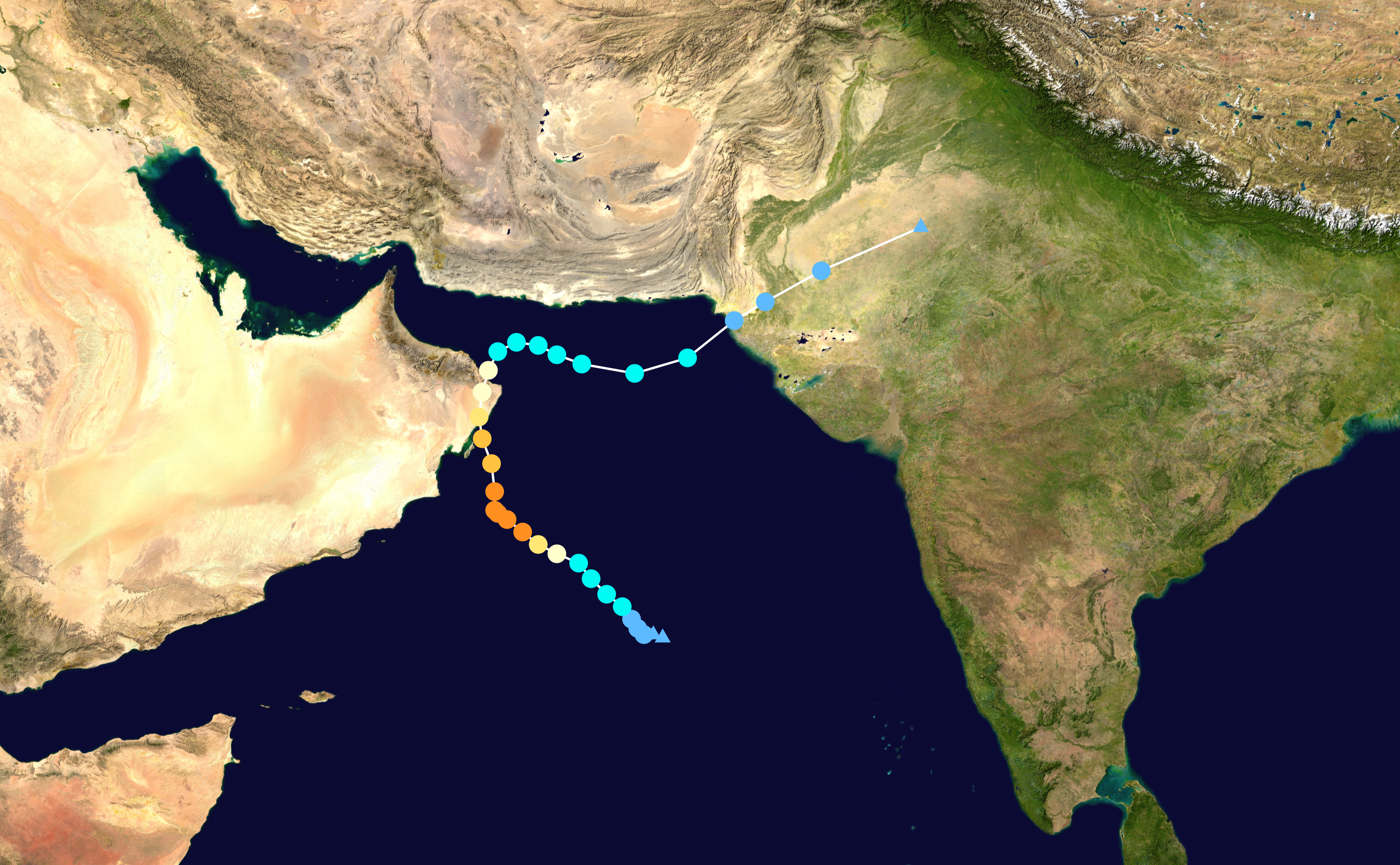
The India Meteorological Department (IMD) described Phet as having "the rarest of the rare track with two landfall points over Oman and Pakistan, and [the] longest track in recent years".

Toward the end of May 2010, a surge in the monsoon produced widespread convection, or thunderstorms, off the southwest coast of India in the southeastern Arabian Sea. After a low-level circulation became evident on 30 May, the India Meteorological Department (IMD) designated the system as a low-pressure area. The low moved northwestward within an area of warm water temperatures of 30 to 32 °C (86 to 90 °F), moderate wind shear, and an upper-level environment conducive for tropical cyclogenesis, The Joint Typhoon Warning Center (JTWC) first noted the system on 30 May as an area of potential development. The circulation became more defined within the building convection, which was amplified by outflow from an anticyclone over the northern Arabian Sea. At 03:00 Coordinated Universal Time (UTC) on 31 May, the IMD designated the system as a depression about 1,000 km (620 mi) west-southwest of Mumbai, India, or about 1,260 km (785 mi) southeast of Muscat, Oman. At 18:00 UTC, the JTWC began issuing advisories on the storm, designating it as Tropical Cyclone 03A.

As the wind shear decreased, the convection increased further, and the IMD upgraded the system to a deep depression at 00:00 UTC on 1 June. Later that day, the system began rapidly intensifying while moving on a northwest trajectory; the IMD upgraded the system to a cyclonic storm at 09:00 UTC, naming it Phet. An eye became evident during a Tropical Rainfall Measuring Mission (TRMM) pass of the storm; its appearance and the development of rainbands showed Phet was intensifying. Late on 1 June, the JTWC upgraded the storm to the equivalent of a minimal hurricane, estimating 1 minute maximum sustained winds of 120 km/h (75 mph), after the eye became better defined and the tightly curved thunderstorm activity. The IMD upgraded Phet to severe cyclonic storm status at 00:00 UTC on 2 June, and further to a very severe cyclonic storm six hours later.

With a ridge to the northeast, the cyclone continued slowly northwestward. The JTWC initially expected that Phet would recurve to the northeast without affecting land, reflecting storm model simulations. Lack of observations across the Arabian Sea prevented more the model forecasts from accurately assessing the ridge. Phet quickly intensified on 2 June as it developed a well-defined 55 km (35 mi) eye, fueled by outflow that was enhanced by a passing mid-latitude trough. At 12:00 UTC on June 2, the IMD estimated peak 3 minute sustained winds of 155 km/h (95 mph). Simultaneously, the JTWC assessed peak 1 minute winds of 230 km/h (145 mph). The agency predicted that Phet would intensify further to reach winds of 260 km/h (160 mph) near the eastern Oman coastline. Drier air from the Arabian Peninsula to the northwest disrupted the storm structure, which caused the eye to become cloud-covered, signaling weakening. Between 00:00–02:00 UTC on 3 June, Phet made landfall in eastern Oman near Al Ashkharah, with winds between 110–120 km/h (70–75 mph) according to the IMD. The JTWC assessed landfall as occurring 16 hours later and with winds of 195 km/h (120 mph).

The cyclone became elongated due to increased wind shear while it turned northeastward around the ridge. High mountains in eastern Oman weakened Phet, causing the structure to become more asymmetrical. At 12:00 UTC on 4 June, the cyclone re-emerged into the Arabian Sea, still presenting banding features and an eye feature but with much less convection. Later that day, the JTWC downgraded Phet to tropical storm status, and by early on 5 June, increased wind shear had displaced the center from the convection. Phet turned eastward once over the Gulf of Oman, weakening to a deep depression by late on 5 June. The circulation remained exposed, producing convection well ahead of the center. At 03:00 UTC on 6 June, the IMD downgraded Phet further to depression status, assessing that the system made landfall at that intensity 12 hours later in southern Pakistan near Karachi. The JTWC discontinued advisories once the storm moved ashore. Phet continued generally eastward, crossing the Pakistan/India in Rajasthan. On 7 June, the depression weakened into a remnant low near Madhya Pradesh.

== Preparations ==
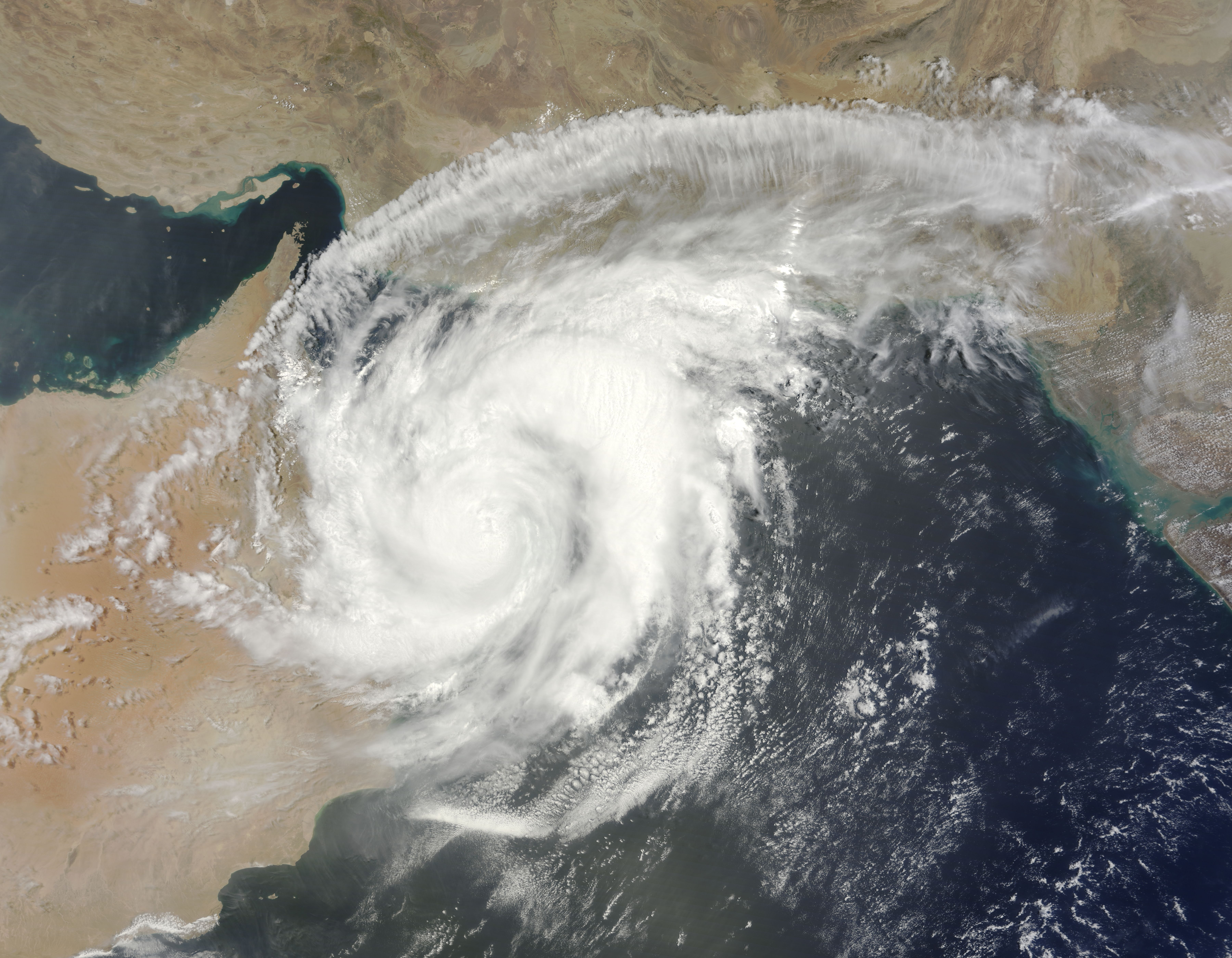
Cyclone Phet inland over Oman

Oman's National Committee for Civil Defence coordinated the country's preparations for Phet, utilizing a national disaster plan that organized the various ministries, and providing early warnings. Storm warnings were broadcast in seven languages, a response to there being only English and Arabic warnings during Cyclone Gonu, which struck Oman in 2007. Residents were advised to remain away from the rough seas during the storm. Businesses and schools were shut down in the areas the storm affected, with schools operating as emergency shelters near Muscat. About 85% of the isolated Masirah Island was evacuated; the passage of Phet and subsequent storms affecting the Arabian Peninsula influenced the Omani government's decision to build a fixed link with the island 40 km (25 mi) offshore. Nationwide, 12,870 people evacuated, utilizing 91 government-opened shelters. Omani officials shut down the country's oil and gas production facilities during the storm.

In the United Arab Emirates, officials activated rescue teams in the event of rough seas and floods from the storm, and recommended that people stay away from the coast.

The President of Pakistan ordered the military and government to take "immediate precautionary measures" as the tropical cyclone approached. Hospitals in Karachi, a city of 16 million people, and coastal areas of Sindh were put on high alert amidst cyclone warnings. Officials advised that fishermen return to port ahead of the cyclone, but more than 450 fishing boats with up to 6,000 people were still at sea. This sequence of events spurred a search and rescue mission by the Pakistan Navy that found 150 of them. Many boats sheltered in mangroves along creeks near the coast. More than 102,000 people evacuated ahead of Phet's landfall with the assistance of the Pakistani Armed Forces, including 60,000 along the coast in Sindh province. Also in Sindh, 29,135 stayed in government shelters, some of which lacked sufficient food. Others stayed in families' house during the storm, although thousands refused to evacuate at all. Coastal roads were closed to prevent people from nearing the rough seas. Officials directed farmers to shut down their irrigation systems. Non-government organizations and United Nations relief groups went on standby. In Karachi, two ports were shut down and cleared of boats, while thousands of billboards were taken down. Two Emirates flights were postponed due to the storm, and train service from Punjab was delayed.

Ahead of the advancing cyclone, over 8,000 people were evacuated from Kutch district in the Indian state of Gujarat.

== Impact and aftermath ==
Death toll
Pakistan	18
Oman	24
India	5
Total	47

=== Oman ===
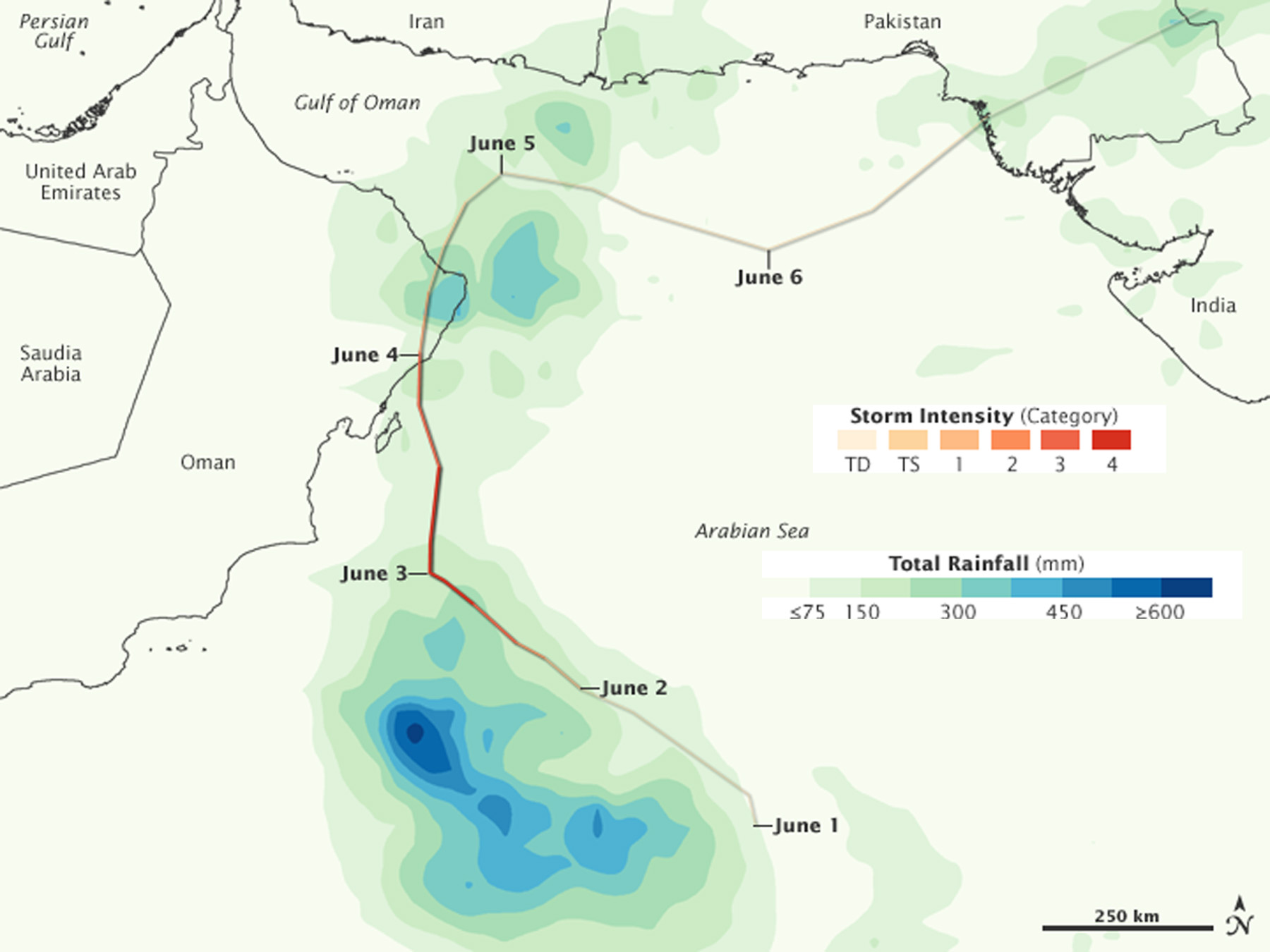
TTRM rainfall map

During its passage, Phet dropped 472 mm (18.6 in) of rainfall and produced winds of 157 km/h (98 mph) on Oman's offshore Masirah Island. On the mainland, winds reached around 120 km/h (75 mph) at Sur along the eastern coastline, while rainfall peaked at 603 mm (23.7 in) in Qurayyat. The heavy rainfall filled and overflowed the newly completed Wadi Dhaiqah Dam, and inundated wadis, which are normally dry river beds. Flash flooding along river banks swept away and killed seven people. Three people trapped by floods had to be rescued by the nation's military, which was deployed to help prepare for the storm.

Across Oman, Phet's damage was estimated at over 300 million rials (US$780 million). Strong winds knocked down billboards, trees, and power lines, causing power outages. Water pipes and desalination plants were also damaged. Storm flooding washed away hundreds of cars, while also damaging roads and bridges. Nationwide, the cyclone wrecked thousands of homes. On the offshore Masirah Island, Phet's storm surge damaged or wrecked some boats, while strong winds damaged tin roofs and satellite dishes. The roof and compound wall of a resort hotel were damaged. Across eastern and northern Oman, heavy rainfall from Phet flooded low-lying areas and produced landslides. The Royal Oman Police helped direct or traffic after many roads were inundated or blocked. The floodwaters entered homes in Al-Ghubra and Al Athaiba, as well as the Qurum market in Muscat. According to Oman's National Committee for Civil Defence, Phet killed 16 people in the country, although the IMD reported the death toll at 24.

Insurance companies in Oman paid out 77 million rials (US$200 million) to policy holders. The Omani Charity Organisation organized a convoy of 22 trucks, which carried water and food to storm victims, including in and around Muscat. The passage of Phet and subsequent storms led to the Omani government researching into building a fixed link with the offshore Masirah Island. Responding to the floods in Sur, the Omani government hired the Strabag construction company to build a new 1.2 km (0.75 mi) earthen dam across Wadi Rafsah. The project, intended to withstand 1 in 10,000 year flooding, was completed in 2016 at the cost of US$122 million.

=== Pakistan ===
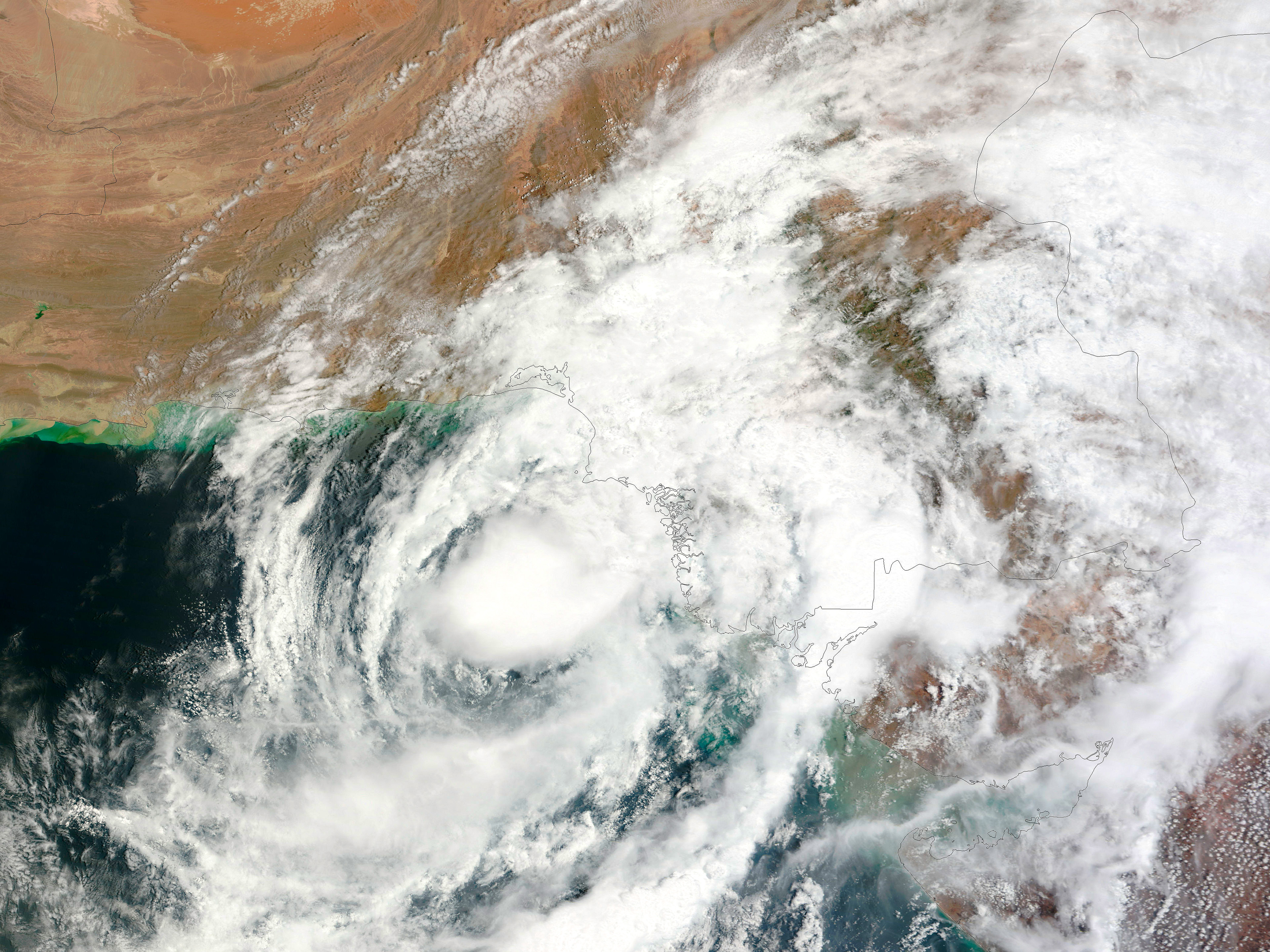
Cyclone Phet near Pakistan on 6 June

Along the Balochistan coast, Phet produced 4 to 5 m (13 to 16 ft) waves. Four boats were stranded at sea during the storm's passage, but the 18 marooned people were rescued by the Pakistani Navy. In southwestern Pakistan, Phet produced its strongest winds in the country at Jiwani, where a station recorded winds of 83 km/h (52 mph). The storm also dropped heavy rainfall, peaking at 370 mm (15 in) in Gwadar, and caused a delay in the annual monsoon season. Phet killed at least 18 people in Pakistan – 11 by electrocution, and 7 due to collapsed walls. The storm also injured dozens of others and left thousands of Pakistanis homeless, after 5,000 houses were washed away. An estimated 200,000 people's lives were significantly affected, and damage was estimated at RS7 billion (US$80 million).

Along the Makran coast, heavy rainfall washed away hundreds of houses, leaving residents to ride out the storm along adjacent hillsides. Between Jiwani and Gwadar, Phet's rains washed away a bridge and damaged several portions of the Makran Coastal Highway, while also halting service for Pakistan Railways. Ten hours of rainfall in Gwadar flooded the port, damaging dozens of boats and launches. Throughout the town, Phet wrecked around 10,000 houses. The storm flooded coastal neighborhoods, inundating the Pakistan Broadcasting Corporation building which temporarily lost its capability for FM broadcasting. For five days, the town and other coastal locations were without power or natural gas due to the storm. Elsewhere, the rains filled and washed away irrigation dams, and swept away fishing boats. Heavy rainfall also caused power outages in Hyderabad. Along the Sindh coast, the storm wrecked around 3,000 houses made largely of straw. Residual storm flooding damaged around 180,000 bags of wheat weighing millions of tons.

Karachi's Jinnah International Airport recorded winds of 56 km/h (35 mph), and storm rainfall reached 152 mm (6.0 in). Years of disaster mitigation prevented significant storm damage in Karachi, although the effects were disruptive. The storm's strong winds downed at least 200 power lines, leaving several neighborhoods without power for over 12 hours. A boy died when shocked in a pool of storm rainfall, one of seven electrocution deaths in the city due to the storm. One building was wrecked during the storm's passage. Traffic accidents occurred after major roadways were inundated. Karachi's sanitation department worked quickly to drain the floods.

Within two days of Phet's passage, most of the evacuees were allowed to return home. In Gwadar however, storm flooding caused shortages of food and medicine, leading to price increases. Balochistan Chief Minister Aslam Raisani allocated RS500 million toward reconstructing damaged areas. The Sindh provincial government declared six districts as disaster areas. The government opened 214 relief camps, with 160 in Karachi alone; these facilities also gave out food to storm victims. These relief camps were also opened in schools to service as temporary hospitals, with 24 medical teams dispatched by the government to help injured residents. The Pakistani military helped in search and rescue missions, and also traveled by air and sea to bring emergency blankets, tents, and medicine to damaged coastal towns. Responding to the storm damage, the Save the Children organization sent supplies to its Hyderabad office, including medical kits for two weeks of care for 8,000 people, as well as 34,000 water purification tablets. The International Red Cross's Disaster Relief Emergency Fund provided US$45,935 to support the Pakistan Red Crescent Society, which gave out 5,000 mosquito nets, along with food and tents to affected families.

=== India ===
While Phet moved ashore Pakistan, its convection spread ahead of the center into India, bringing heavy rainfall up to 180 mm (7.1 in) in western Rajasthan. The rains helped alleviate drought conditions, but the associated floods killed several animals, including 11 chinkaras and 35 blackbucks, and many livestock. Heavy rains also knocked down trees and power lines, while also covering highways and rail lines; 250 people became stranded when four train lines going to Jaisalmer were canceled. Near Pokhran, floodwaters 3.0 m (10 ft) deep washed away 35 houses. This led to the Indian Armed Forces to evacuate about 300 villagers and to rescue 60 people from a flooded mosque. Phet killed five people in India, all in Gujarat – three of the fatalities by electrocution, one by a lightning strike, and one by drowning.

== See also ==
- Tropical cyclones in 2010
- 2010 Pakistan floods – severe floods that affected Pakistan a month after Phet
- Arabian Peninsula tropical cyclones
  - Cyclone Gonu (2007)
  - Cyclone Yemyin (2007)
  - Cyclone Kyarr (2019)
- Related lists
  - List of the most intense tropical cyclones in the Arabian Sea and Bay of Bengal
  - List of wettest tropical cyclones in Pakistan
