= Hurricane Karl =

Category 3 Atlantic hurricane in 2010

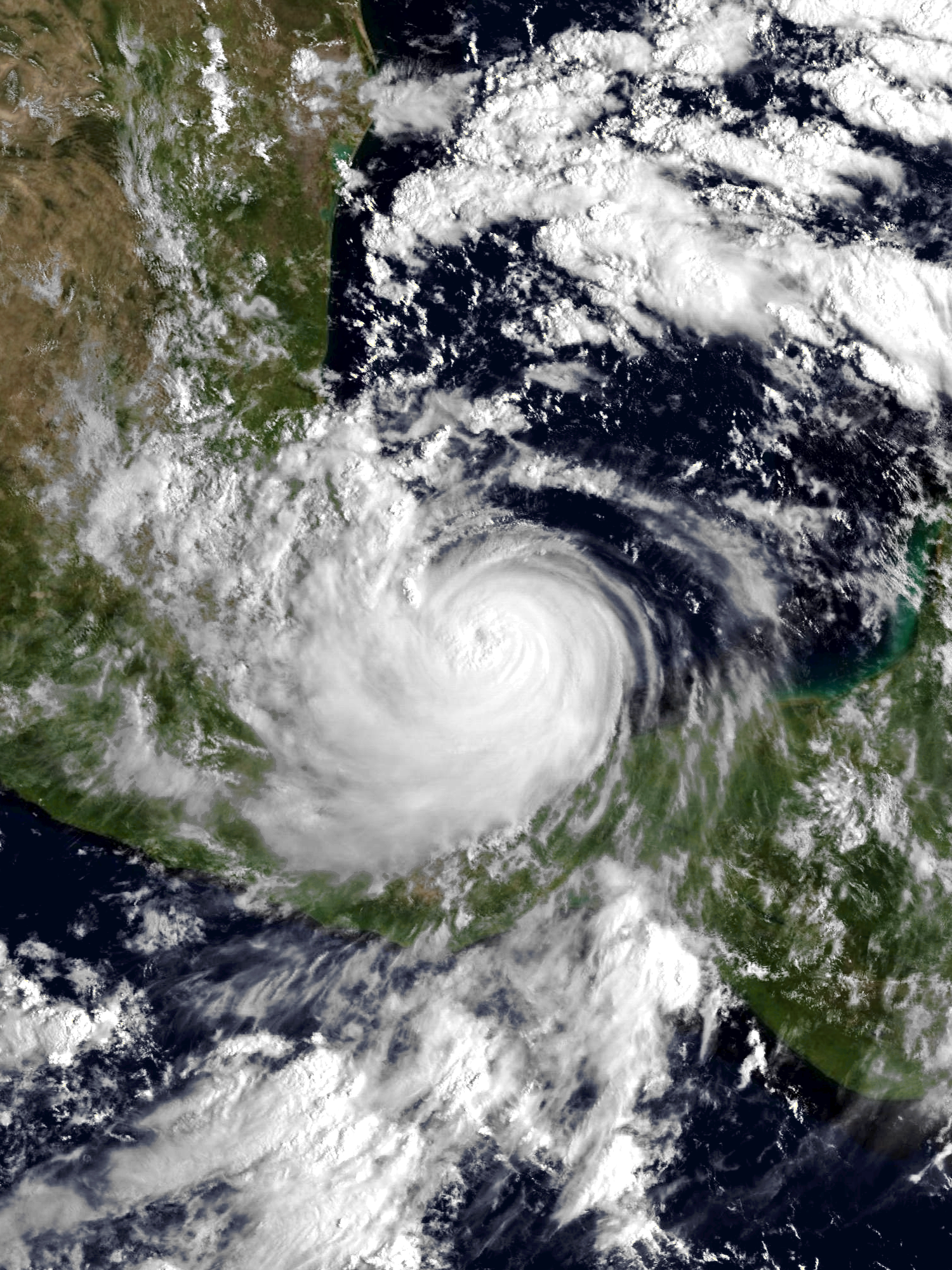
- Hurricane Karl at peak intensity, shortly before landfall in Mexico on September 17

Meteorological history
- Formed: September 14, 2010
- Dissipated: September 18, 2010

Category 3 major hurricane
- 1-minute sustained (SSHWS/NWS)
- Highest winds: 125 mph (205 km/h)
- Lowest pressure: 956 mbar (hPa); 28.23 inHg

Overall effects
- Fatalities: 22 total
- Damage: $3.9 billion (2010 USD) (Fourth-costliest in Mexican history)
- Areas affected: Belize, Yucatán Peninsula, Veracruz
- IBTrACS
- Part of the 2010 Atlantic hurricane season

Hurricane Karl was the most destructive tropical cyclone on record to strike the Mexican state of Veracruz. The eleventh tropical storm, sixth hurricane, and fifth and final major hurricane of the 2010 Atlantic hurricane season, Karl formed from an area of low pressure which had formed off of the northern coast of Venezuela on September 11. It crossed the Caribbean and was upgraded to Tropical Storm Karl on September 14. The cyclone made landfall on the Yucatan Peninsula of Mexico as a strong tropical storm, and then rapidly strengthened in the Bay of Campeche before it made landfall near the city of Veracruz, on the central Mexican Gulf coast, as a major hurricane. This marked the first known time that a major hurricane existed in the Bay of Campeche. Afterwards, the storm rapidly weakened over the mountains of Mexico and dissipated on September 18.

At least 22 people were confirmed dead, most of which were in the state of Veracruz. Insured losses from the storm were estimated to be US$206 million, with total economic losses of approximately $3.9 billion.

== Meteorological history ==
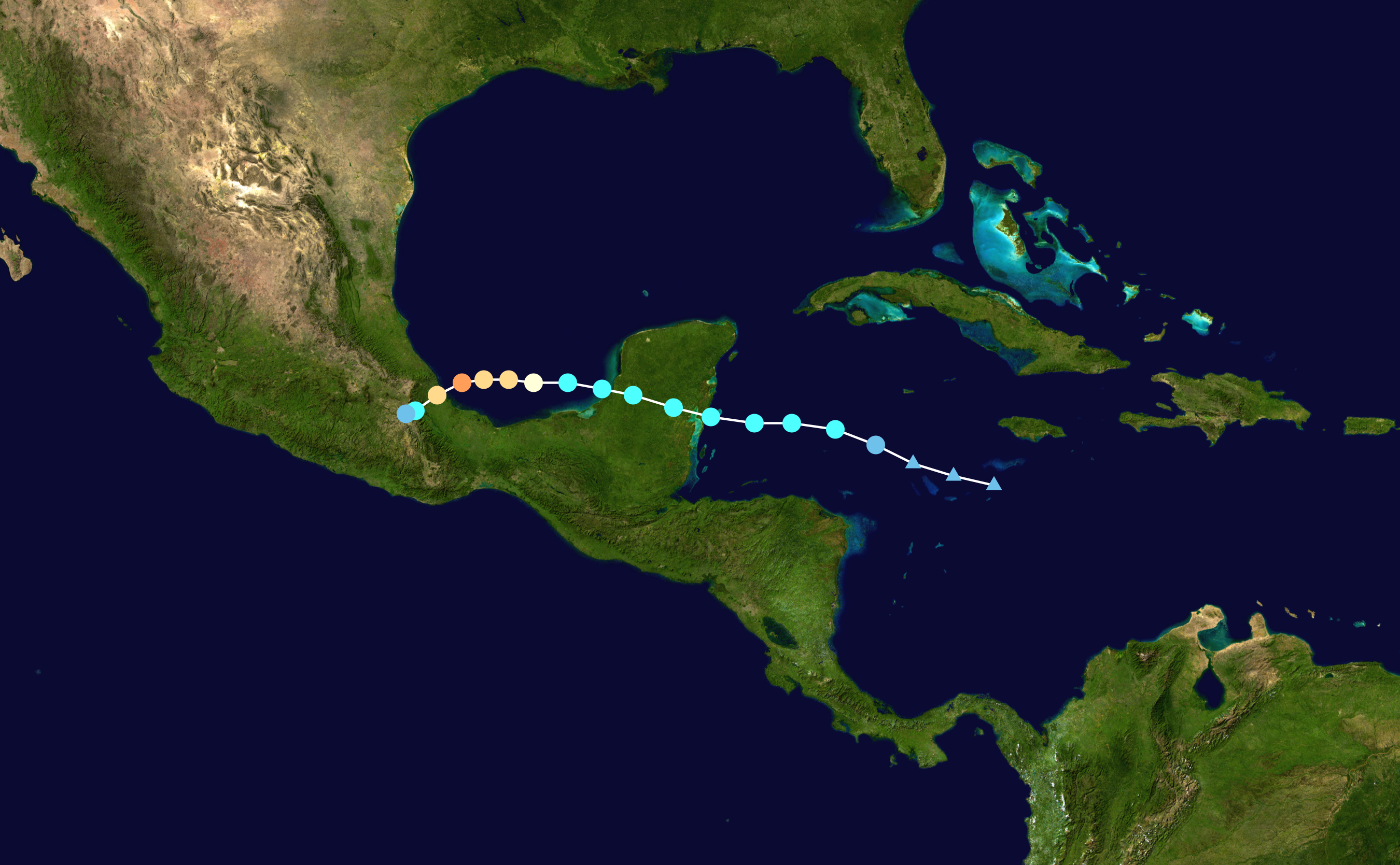
Map plotting the storm's track and intensity, according to the Saffir–Simpson scale Map key Saffir–Simpson scale Tropical depression (≤38 mph, ≤62 km/h) Tropical storm (39–73 mph, 63–118 km/h) Category 1 (74–95 mph, 119–153 km/h) Category 2 (96–110 mph, 154–177 km/h) Category 3 (111–129 mph, 178–208 km/h) Category 4 (130–156 mph, 209–251 km/h) Category 5 (≥157 mph, ≥252 km/h) Unknown Storm type Tropical cyclone Subtropical cyclone Extratropical cyclone, remnant low, tropical disturbance, or monsoon depression

The origins of Hurricane Karl were from the interaction between a surface trough and westward-tracking tropical wave. The trough—an elongated area of low pressure—emerged from an area of disorganized monsoonal convection just north of South America over the Windward Islands in early September. A few days later, the wave, which had departed the coast of Africa on September 1, approached the area and merged with the trough by September 8 as it slowed. For several days, the resultant low-pressure system lingered toward the west-northwest over the Caribbean Sea, and provided with a diffluent environment aloft it generated disorganized patches of convection. Although the convection remained disassociated from the mean low feature, the overall wind circulation continued to become better defined at the surface. The development trend briefly became disrupted by September 13, however, with the surface low confirmed no longer to exist under the improving convective structure. Conditions remained favorable for reorganization, and a small but consolidated circulation center developed by 2100 UTC September 14. In real time, this marked the formation of Tropical Storm Karl when it was located about 270 mi (435 km) east of Chetumal, Mexico, though post-storm reanalysis revealed a tropical depression had in fact formed six hours earlier.

With a predominant ridge anchored to its north along the Gulf of Mexico, Karl continued a generally westward motion for most of its duration. Supported by symmetrical upper-level outflow, the storm strengthened slowly over very high water temperatures in a low-shear environment. Karl subsequently made its initial landfall on the southeastern coast of Yucatán as a strong tropical storm early on September 15, with estimated winds of 65 mph (100 km/h). As it moved inland, radar imagery from Belize depicted a developing eye, suggesting the storm might have reached hurricane status at the time. Although the storm slowly weakened as it crossed the Yucatán, its cloud pattern remained well-organized, with a ring of deep convection surrounding an eye-like feature. Around 0400 UTC September 16, the center of Karl emerged into the Bay of Campeche as it slowed slightly. Situated once again over warm waters in a favorable shear environment, Karl steadily intensified and reached hurricane status about 150 mi (240 km) off the coast of Campeche, Mexico, after reconnaissance found a developing eyewall. At the time, Karl co-existed with hurricanes Igor and Julia, the first such occasion since 1998 with at least three simultaneous hurricanes in the North Atlantic.

Hurricane Karl rapidly intensifying in the Bay of Campeche on September 16

The hurricane entered a period of rapid intensification after steadily deepening for several hours; its cloud pattern quickly organized, and with cooling convective cloudtops the warm eye became well-defined. Recurving toward the southwest along the building ridge, Karl became a Category 3 hurricane on September 17; it reached its peak intensity of 125 mph (205 km/h) only four hours prior to landfall. Karl became the strongest hurricane ever observed in the Bay of Campeche upon attaining this intensity, a record previously set by Hurricane Item in 1950, – later to be tied by Hurricane Grace in 2021. Despite a sudden increase in minimum central pressure, Karl retained its strength and moved ashore near Veracruz, Mexico as a major hurricane at 16:45 UTC. Once inland, the small storm rapidly weakened over the high terrain, and by early September 18 no deep convection remained around its increasingly disrupted circulation. Around 0900 UTC, the system was declassified as a tropical cyclone as its low-level circulation dissipated, though patches of remnant thunderstorms continued to produce heavy precipitation over the country.

== Preparations ==
=== Western Caribbean ===
Tropical Storm Karl moving ashore in the Yucatán Peninsula on September 15

Upon the formation of a tropical cyclone, the government of Mexico issued a tropical storm warning for the east coast of the Yucatán Peninsula, extending from Chetumal northward to Cabo Catoche. Additionally, a tropical storm watch was in place for the coast of northern Belize, from Belize City to the Belize–Mexico border. At the threat of a storm, authorities in Honduras declared a green alert for the entire country; a yellow alert was to remain in effect for 36 hours in the Bay Islands Department. (Note: The Central American hurricane alert system uses the colors blue, green, yellow, orange, and red to denote the scale of danger, with blue indicating the lowest threat and red the greatest. Source: "Alerta Huracane". Bomberos y Protección Civil de Quintana Roo IAP. 2003. Archived from the original on January 2, 2014.) El Cajón, a major hydroelectric power plant located in western Honduras, discharged some of its water reservoir into connecting rivers to prevent flooding of surrounding low-lying areas. Port officials along the coastlines were advised to take necessary precautions due to rough sea conditions. In Belize, seaports secured their supplies and halted operations to ensure the safety of seafaring vessels and marine workers. Schools were closed in the northern districts of Corozal and Orange Walk, as well as in San Pedro Town and Caye Caulker during the storm's passage.

In Quintana Roo, officials opened shelters and ordered the evacuation of low-lying areas along the storm's projected path. Hundreds of people were displaced at Banco Chinchorro, an atoll reef and diving center near Majahual. In Carillo Puerto, located to the south of the archaeological ruins of Tulum, authorities readied concrete residences to provide shelter to some hundred communities of indigenous Mayans. As Karl moved further inland, orange alerts were declared in Campeche for the municipalities of Hopelchén and Calakmul, while the rest of the state remained under yellow alert. Shelters were opened near flood-prone areas in the cities of Campeche, Champotón and the municipality of Calkiní (Isla Arena). Local residents were urged not to take out their trash for three days, as collection services were to be suspended at the threat of torrential rainfall.

=== Veracruz ===
The government of the Veracruz issued a red alert as Karl approached the state's coastline; eight municipalities were placed under mandatory coastal evacuation orders. Laguna Verde Nuclear Power Station, located in the Veracruz coastline, stopped its operations as a precaution. Additionally, Pemex evacuated its facilities on the Gulf of Mexico that were located in Karl's path. World oil prices rose rapidly on September 17 as the company stopped production on 14 of its wells. The prices climbed 54 cents to 75.11 dollars a barrel.

== Impact and aftermath ==
=== Yucatán Peninsula ===
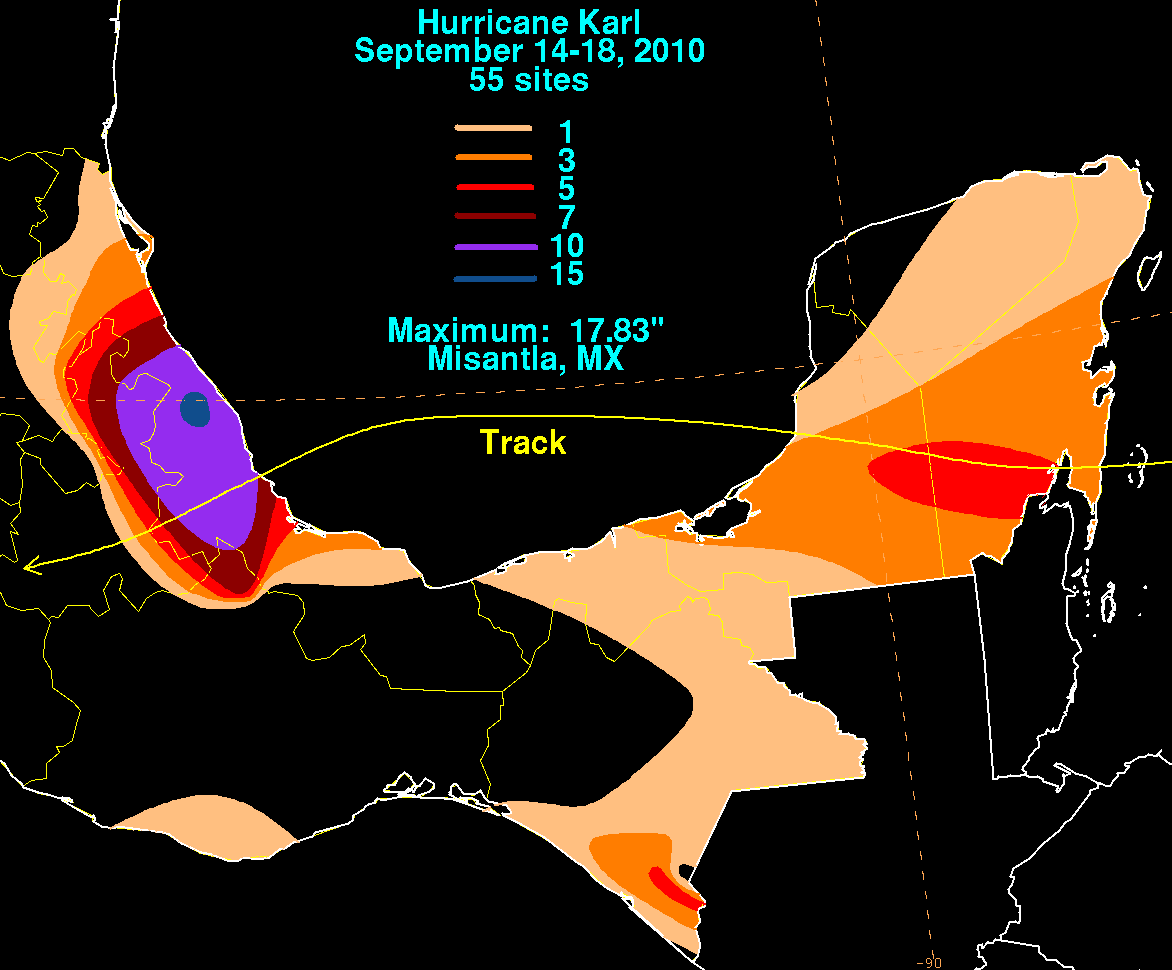
Storm total rainfall from Karl in Mexico

As Karl struck the coast of Quintana Roo, heavy precipitation amounting up to 6.2 inches (157 mm) in some areas resulted in scattered flooding. At the height of the storm, a total of 54,265 residents were without power, but most had their electricity restored within a day. Some 600 homes in Chetumal suffered inundations of up to 4.9 ft (1.5 m), forcing hundreds of residents to evacuate. High winds reportedly uprooted several trees in Bacalar, a small village near the city. The municipalities of Othon P. Blanco, Carillo Puerto, and José María Morelos reported copious losses in agriculture; an estimated total of 11,650 hectares of crop were affected, with 3,477 hectares of maiz crop destroyed. Approximately 7,800 hectares of sugarcane along the banks of the Hondo River were lost, resulting in economic losses of Mex$76 million (US$6.23 million). In Othon P. Blanco, 477 hectares of jalapeño chili peppers were lost while banana, cassava and citrus plantations in the area sustained significant wind damage. In total, damage to roads, structures and properties in the municipality was estimated at Mex$120 million (US$9.9 million).

Though there were no reports of major damage, strong winds in Belize downed utility poles, grounded water crafts and caused power outages along the Belize–Mexico border. Further inland in Campeche, maximum 24-hour rainfall accumulations totaled no more than 0.95 inches (24 mm), and little damage was reported. The storm left no fatalities in its wake in the peninsula, as its landfall occurred in a sparsely populated area.

=== Southeastern Mexico ===
Video from NASA's Global Hawk aircraft as it examined Hurricane Karl.

Torrential rains from Karl extended well inland into the Sierra Madre Oriental, causing severe floods and mud slides across Veracruz as well as in several neighboring Mexican states. The heaviest precipitation occurred adjacent to and northward of the storm's track, with localized accumulations of up to 17.83 inches (455 mm) recorded in Misantla. On landfall, major-hurricane-force winds uprooted hundred thousands of trees and caused widespread power outages, leaving up to 280,000 customers in the dark. The disaster affected at least 163 of the state's 212 municipalities, and several days after its passage more than half of the territory remained submerged by the flood waters. It caused the largest population displacement in the region's history; about 150,000 residents evacuated to a total of 423 storm shelters statewide. Karl claimed the lives of a confirmed twelve people in the state, among which a 40-year-old woman, along with her two- and three-year-old grandchildren in Cotaxtla, and a 54-year-old and an 87-year-old in Felipe Carrillo. Two other fatalities were however mentioned as being possibly attributed to the storm in an official government press release on September 24, 2010.

Costliest Non-retired Hurricanes
Rank	Cyclone	Season	Damage
1	Sally	2020	$7.3 billion
2	Isaias	2020	$5.02 billion
3	Imelda	2019	$5.0 billion
4	Debby	2024	$4.5 billion
5	Zeta	2020	$4.4 billion
6	Karl	2010	$3.9 billion
7	Idalia	2023	$3.6 billion
8	Isaac	2012	$3.11 billion
9	Delta	2020	$3.09 billion
10	Lee	2011	$2.8 billion

In addition to the loss of life, structural damage in the state was widespread and particularly severe. In Cotaxtla, damaging muddy waters up to 12 m (39 ft) high left much of the municipality inundated and scores structures encased in mud. In some areas, the flooding was described as being "unprecedented". Carrillo Puerto suffered similar damage; two people were reported missing in the city. The impact on the vegetation was particularly notable in Boca del Río—situated near the mouth of the Jamapa River—where the winds downed well over 400,000 trees; a consequent clogging of the river mouth prompted about 30,000 people to evacuate from adjacent areas. In Puebla, two people were killed after their home was destroyed in a landslide. A third person was killed in Tabasco after she drowned in her flooded home. An estimated 200,000 residences were left without power as a result of Karl.

In total, Karl killed 16 people and left 11 others missing. An estimated 15.8 million people were affected by the storm throughout Mexico. Preliminary assessments placed the damage from Karl in Veracruz at 70 billion MXN (US$5.6 billion). In Puebla, losses from the storm reached 200 million MXN (US$16 million). Final estimates of economic losses throughout Mexico total MXN50 billion (US$3.9 billion), with insured losses at MXN2.5 billion (US$200 million).

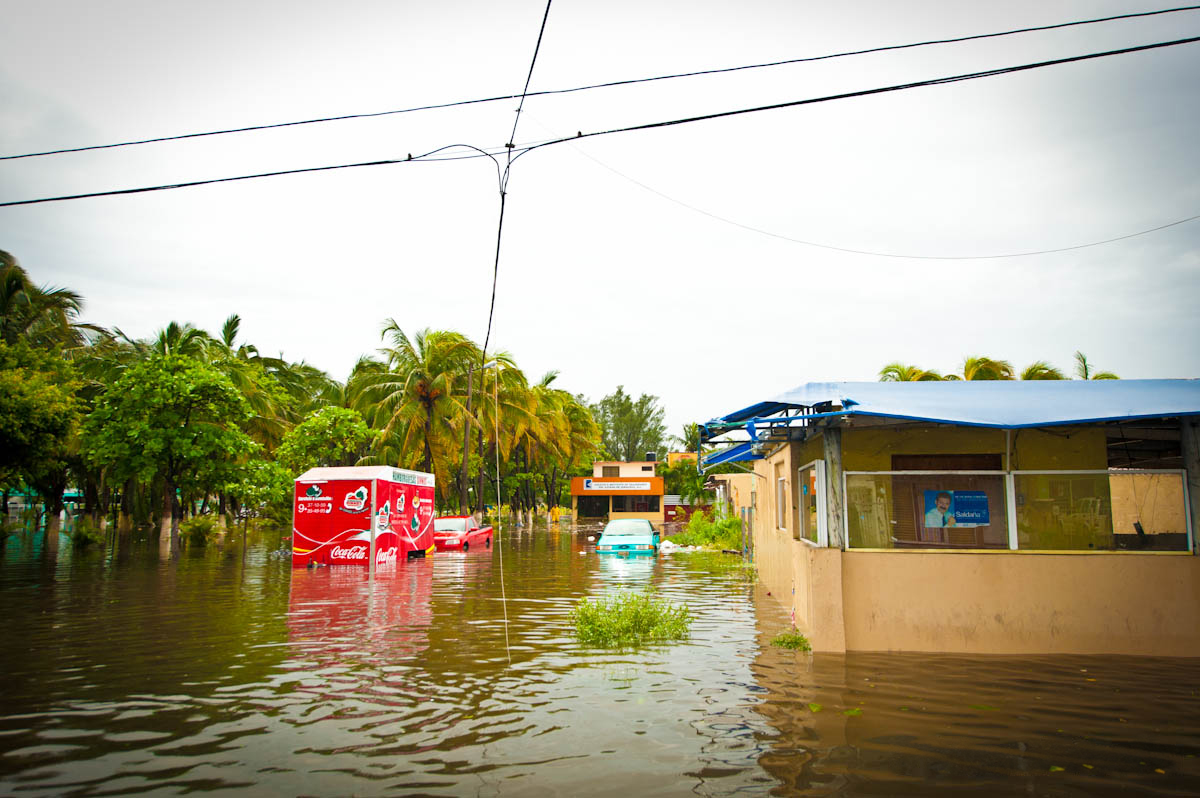
Flooding from the storm in Veracruz

Following severe flooding triggered by Karl, roughly 3,500 people sought refuge in shelters set up at schools throughout Veracruz. Between 250,000 and 500,000 people are believed to have been left homeless as 120 municipalities throughout the state experience extensive floods. Emergency officials stated that all warnings would remain in place despite Karl having already passed to keep the public informed of lingering danger. In the weeks following the hurricane, recovery crews cleared roughly 18,000 tonnes of debris throughout the state of Veracruz.

== See also ==
- Tropical cyclones in 2010
- List of Category 3 Atlantic hurricanes
- Hurricane Ella (1970)
- Hurricane Diana (1990)
- Hurricane Stan (2005)
- Hurricane Franklin (2017)
- Hurricane Grace (2021)
