= Typhoon Chaba (2010) =

Pacific typhoon in 2010

Typhoon Chaba (Katring)
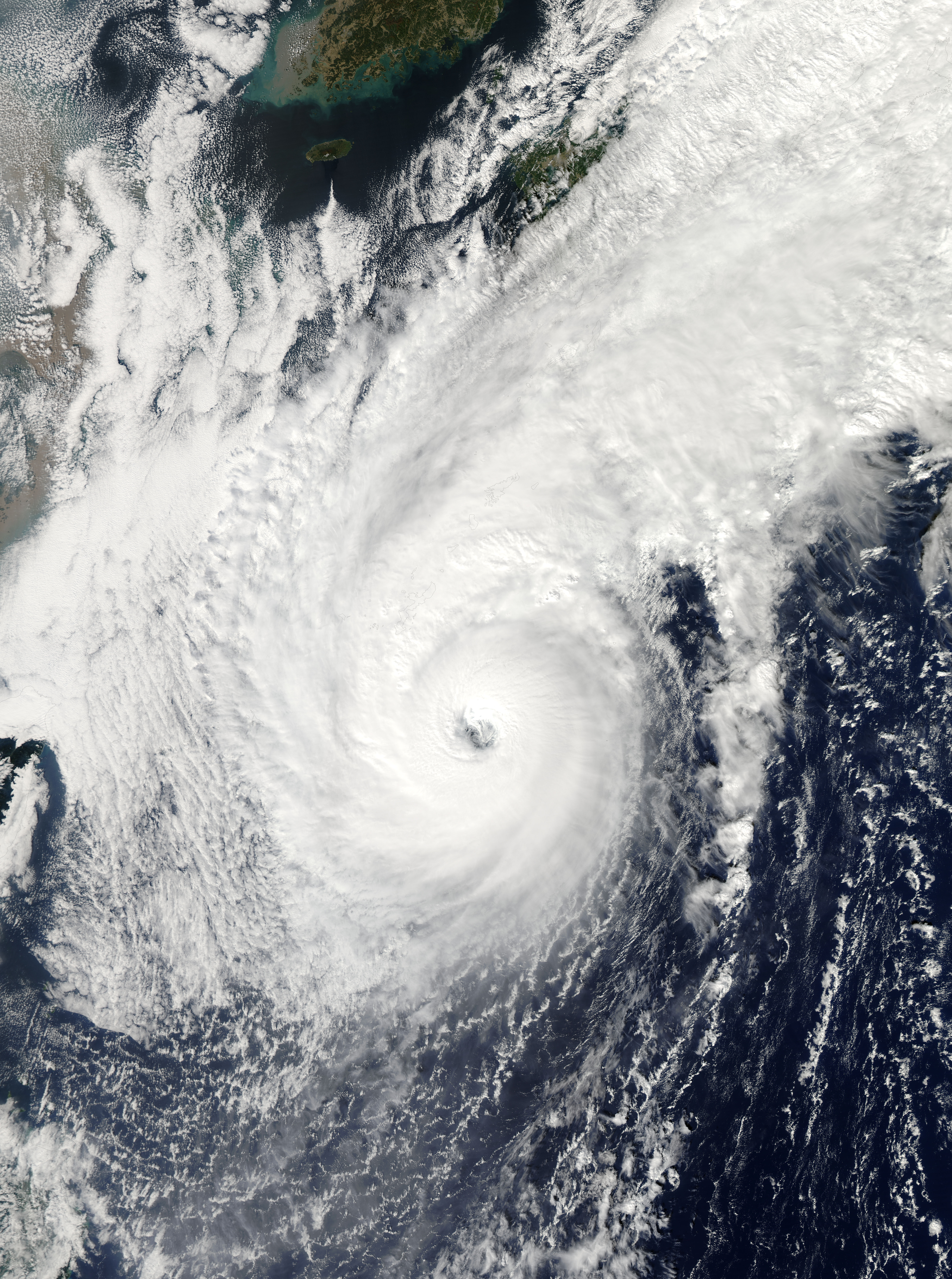
- Typhoon Chaba near peak strength off the Ryukyu Islands on 28 October

Meteorological history
- Formed: 20 October 2010
- Extratropical: 30 October 2010
- Dissipated: 1 November 2010

Very strong typhoon
- 10-minute sustained (JMA)
- Highest winds: 175 km/h (110 mph)
- Lowest pressure: 930 hPa (mbar); 27.46 inHg

Category 4-equivalent typhoon
- 1-minute sustained (SSHWS/JTWC)
- Highest winds: 215 km/h (130 mph)
- Lowest pressure: 937 hPa (mbar); 27.67 inHg

Overall effects
- Fatalities: None
- Damage: None
- Areas affected: Japan
- IBTrACS
- Part of the 2010 Pacific typhoon season

Typhoon Chaba, (Note: The name Chaba (Thai: ชบา, [t͡ɕʰa˦˥ baː˧]) was contributed by Thailand and refers to the Chinese hibiscus (Hibiscus rosa-sinensis) in Thai.) known in the Philippines as Typhoon Katring, was a powerful tropical cyclone that became the first typhoon to impact Japan since Typhoon Melor in October 2009. Chaba was the fourteenth named storm, and seventh typhoon of the 2010 Pacific typhoon season.

== Meteorological history ==
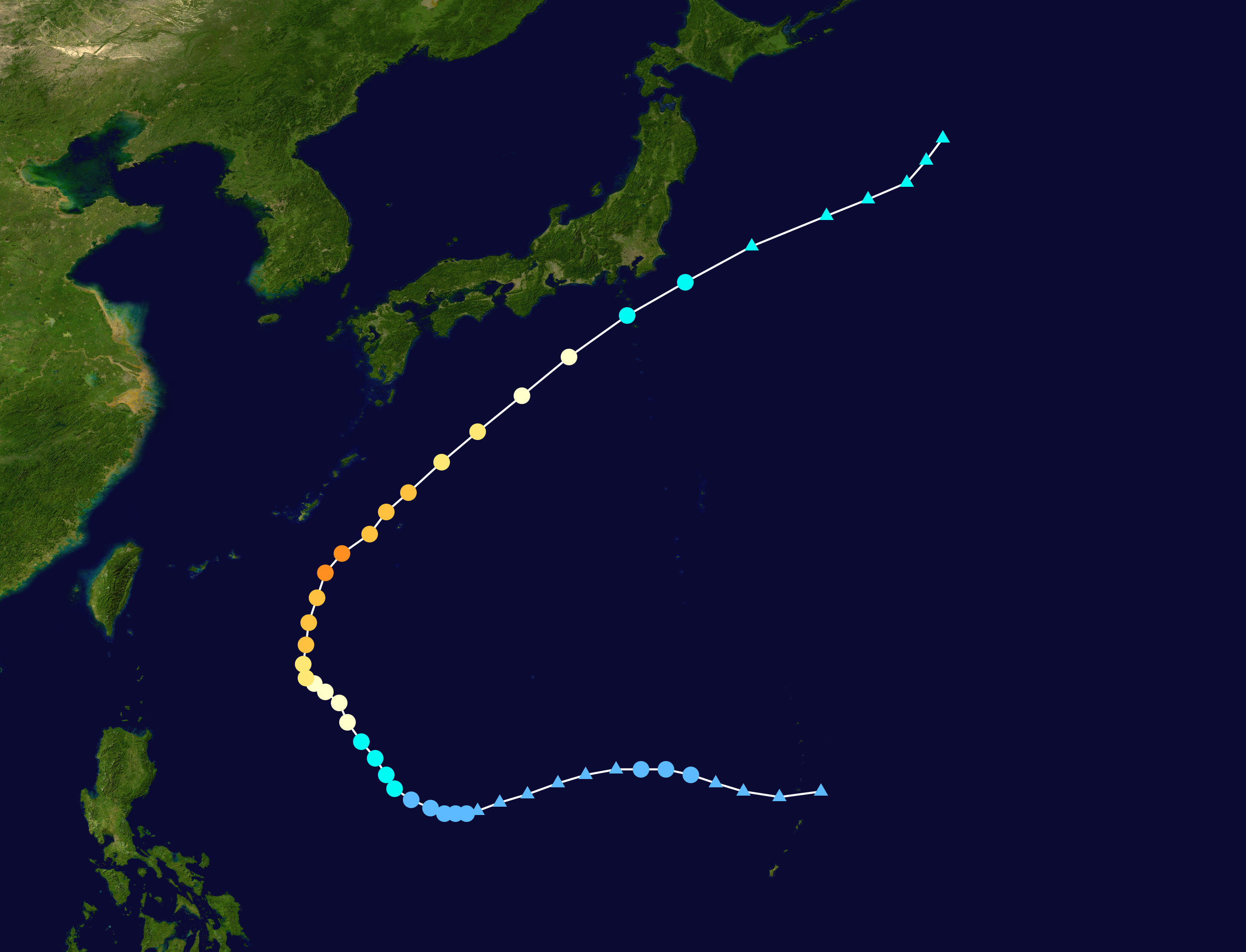
Map plotting the storm's track and intensity, according to the Saffir–Simpson scale Map key Saffir–Simpson scale Tropical depression (≤38 mph, ≤62 km/h) Tropical storm (39–73 mph, 63–118 km/h) Category 1 (74–95 mph, 119–153 km/h) Category 2 (96–110 mph, 154–177 km/h) Category 3 (111–129 mph, 178–208 km/h) Category 4 (130–156 mph, 209–251 km/h) Category 5 (≥157 mph, ≥252 km/h) Unknown Storm type Tropical cyclone Subtropical cyclone Extratropical cyclone, remnant low, tropical disturbance, or monsoon depression

Early on 20 October, the Japan Meteorological Agency (JMA) upgraded an area of low pressure into a tropical depression. Later that day, the JMA reported that the tropical depression slightly intensified. The next day, the Joint Typhoon Warning Center started monitoring the system as tropical depression 16W. On 23 October, the system entered the Philippine Area of responsibility and the Philippine Atmospheric, Geophysical and Astronomical Services Administration (PAGASA) started monitoring the system as Tropical Depression "Katring" On 24 October, the JMA and JTWC upgraded the tropical depression into a tropical storm and the JMA named it "Chaba". On 25 October, the JMA further upgraded the storm into a Severe Tropical Storm. Later that day, the JTWC upgraded the storm into a Category 1 Typhoon. Early on 26 October, the JMA further upgraded the storm into a Typhoon. Early on 27 October, the JTWC upgraded the typhoon into a Category 2 Typhoon. Later that day, the JTWC further upgraded the typhoon into a Category 3 Typhoon. The following day JTWC upgraded the system into a Category 4 Typhon. Later that day, the JTWC downgraded Chaba into a Category 3 Typhoon. Early on 29 October, the JTWC further downgraded Chaba into a Category 2 Typhoon, while the JTWC downgraded it into a Category 1 Typhoon. Early on 30 October, the JTWC reported that Chaba had transitioned into an extratropical cyclone. During the afternoon of 30 October, the JMA downgraded Chaba to a remnant low as passed near Japan. The remnants of Chaba continued to weaken as it moved northeast, but strengthened again in approaching the Gulf of Alaska into a major storm with 55-knot winds, kicking up 40–50-foot waves, with pressure as low as 939 mb. The storm's center came ashore in the vicinity of Cordova, Alaska on 1 November, but not before pulling an atmospheric river of moisture into the American Pacific Northwest, setting a record for that date of precipitation in Seattle.

== Preparations and impact ==
A palm tree in the winds of Typhoon Chaba in Okinawa, Japan

In preparation for Chaba, more than 160 flights were cancelled. Islanders in southern Japan started sandbagging doors and reinforcing windows as Chaba churned closer. Strong winds and heavy rains lashed through Okinawa and there were a lot of concerns about the island of Amami which was in the typhoon's path. Over 257 residents were evacuated from the Amami Islands to higher grounds, schools and town halls which were converted into evacuation centers. Late on 29 October, Chaba approached Amami island region in Kagoshima. Strong winds injured five people and felled electric poles cutting electricity supply. Landfall was predicted on the main island of Honshu. On Minami-Daito Island in Okinawa Prefecture, winds from the typhoon gusted up to 160 km/h (99 mph), resulting in roughly 500 residences losing power. Five people were also injured across the island. Chaba dumped nearly 50 mm (2.0 in) of rain per hour across southern Japan. Races in Tokyo were postponed by the Japan Racing Association until 1 November because of the typhoon.

== Retirement and naming issues ==
The name Katring was originally retired by PAGASA following the impact of Typhoon Thelma in 1987 and was replaced with Karing. It was reintroduced when PAGASA updated its naming lists in 2001, but was removed again after 2010 due to its association with the 1987 typhoon. It was eventually replaced by the name Kanor, which drew controversy as it is coincidentally the name of a person who was involved in a sex scandal that went viral just a few years prior. PAGASA later changed Kanor to Karding in September 2014.

== See also ==
- Typhoon Jangmi (2008)
- Typhoon Neoguri (2014)
- Typhoon Nuri (2014)
