= Tropical cyclones in 2009 =

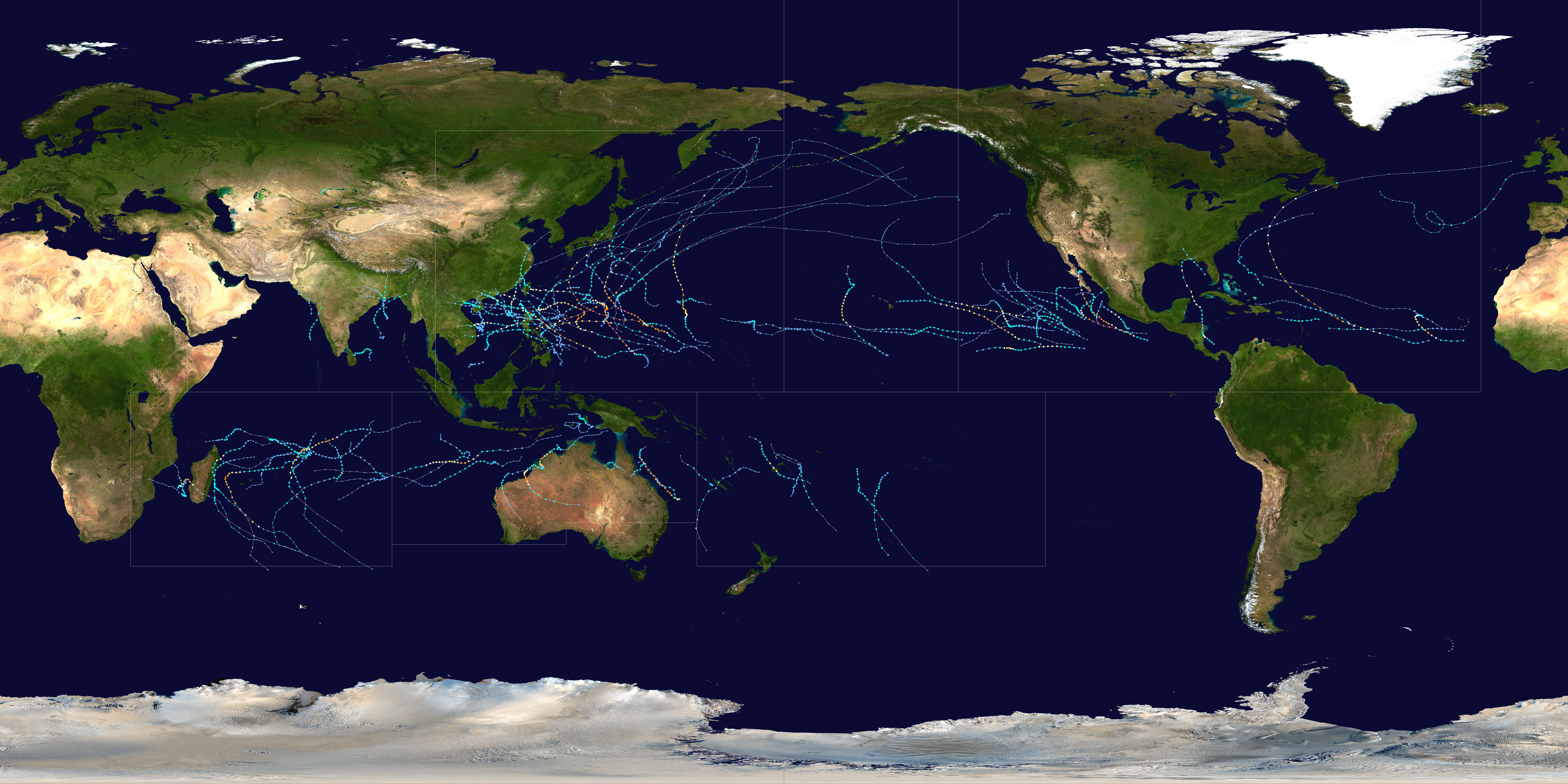
- Year summary map

Year boundaries
- First system: Auring
- Formed: January 3, 2009
- Last system: 02U
- Dissipated: January 6, 2010

Strongest system
- Name: Nida
- Lowest pressure: 905 mbar (hPa); 26.72 inHg

Longest lasting system
- Name: Parma
- Duration: 17 days

Year statistics
- Total systems: 130
- Named systems: 81
- Total fatalities: 3,048 total
- Total damage: $14.24 billion (2009 USD)
Related articles
- 2009 Atlantic hurricane season
- 2009 Pacific hurricane season
- 2009 Pacific typhoon season
- 2009 North Indian Ocean cyclone season
- 2008–09 South-West Indian Ocean cyclone season
- 2009–10 South-West Indian Ocean cyclone season
- 2008–09 Australian region cyclone season
- 2009–10 Australian region cyclone season
- 2008–09 South Pacific cyclone season
- 2009–10 South Pacific cyclone season

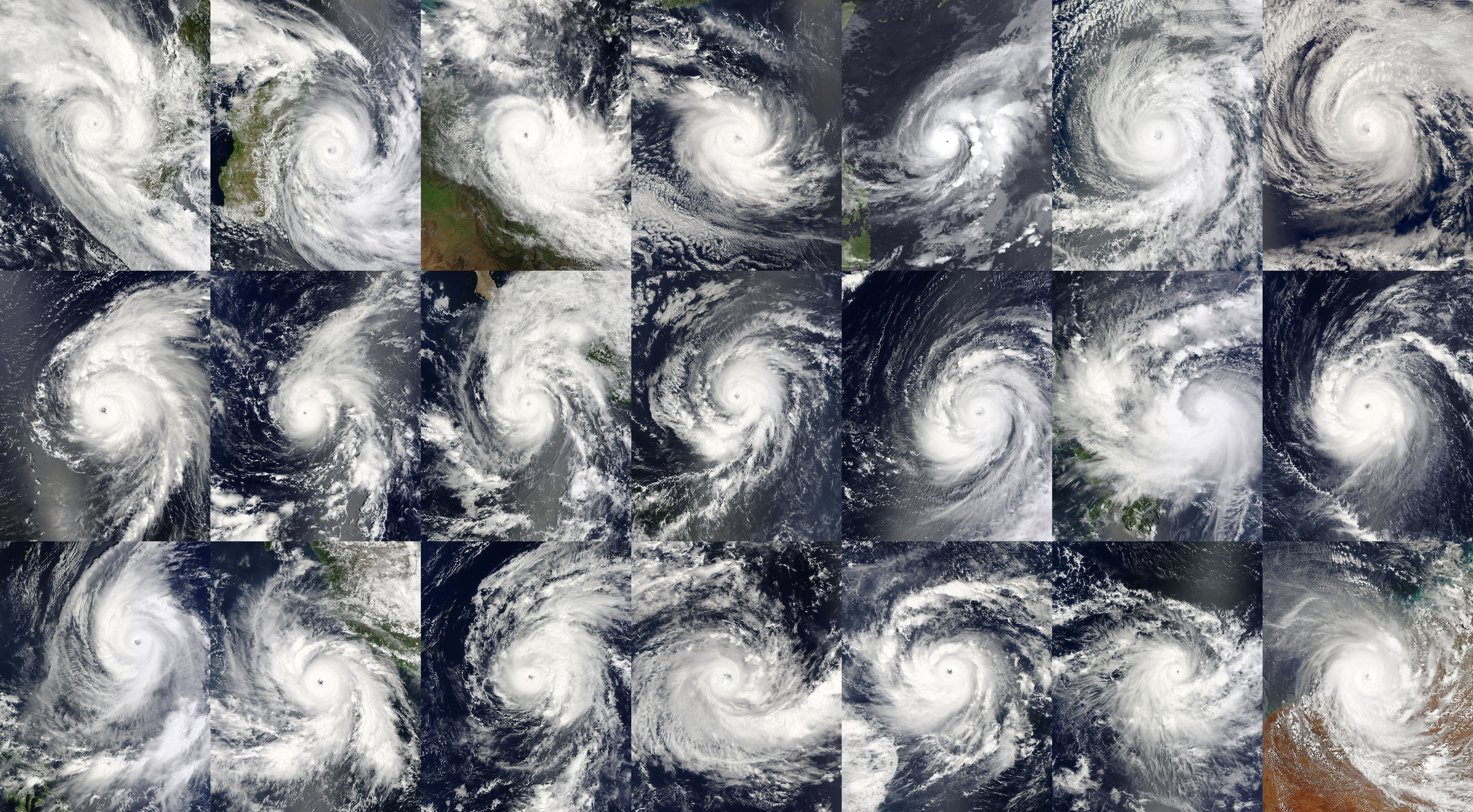
Satellite photos of the 21 tropical cyclones worldwide that reached at least Category 3 on the Saffir–Simpson scale during 2009, from Fanele in January to Laurence in December. Among them, Nida (third-to-last image in the final row) was the most intense, with a minimum central pressure of 905 hPa.

Throughout 2009, 130 tropical cyclones formed in bodies of water known as tropical cyclone basins. Of these, 81 were named, including a Subtropical cyclone in the South Atlantic Ocean, by various weather agencies when they attained maximum sustained winds of 35 knots (65 km/h; 40 mph). The strongest storm of the year was Typhoon Nida in the Western Pacific Ocean. The deadliest and costliest storm of the year was Typhoon Morakot (Kiko), causing 789 fatalities and $6.2 billion worth of damages through its track in the Philippines, Japan, Taiwan, China, and the Korean Peninsula. Throughout the year, twenty-one Category 3 tropical cyclones formed, including five Category 5 tropical cyclones in the year. The accumulated cyclone energy (ACE) index for the 2009 (seven basins combined), as calculated by Colorado State University was 609.6 units.

Tropical cyclones are primarily monitored by a group of ten warning centres, which have been designated as a Regional Specialized Meteorological Center (RSMC) or a Tropical Cyclone Warning Center (TCWC) by the World Meteorological Organization. These are the United States National Hurricane Center (NHC) and Central Pacific Hurricane Center, the Japan Meteorological Agency (JMA), the India Meteorological Department (IMD), Météo-France, Indonesia's Badan Meteorologi, Klimatologi, dan Geofisika, the Australian Bureau of Meteorology (BOM), Papua New Guinea's National Weather Service, the Fiji Meteorological Service (FMS) as well as New Zealand's MetService. Other notable warning centres include the Philippine Atmospheric, Geophysical and Astronomical Services Administration (PAGASA), the United States Joint Typhoon Warning Center (JTWC), and the Brazilian Navy Hydrographic Center.

== Global atmospheric and hydrological conditions ==
The 2009–10 El Niño event started in the Pacific Ocean during May 2009, and it would peak in December of the year.

== Summary ==
=== North Atlantic Ocean ===
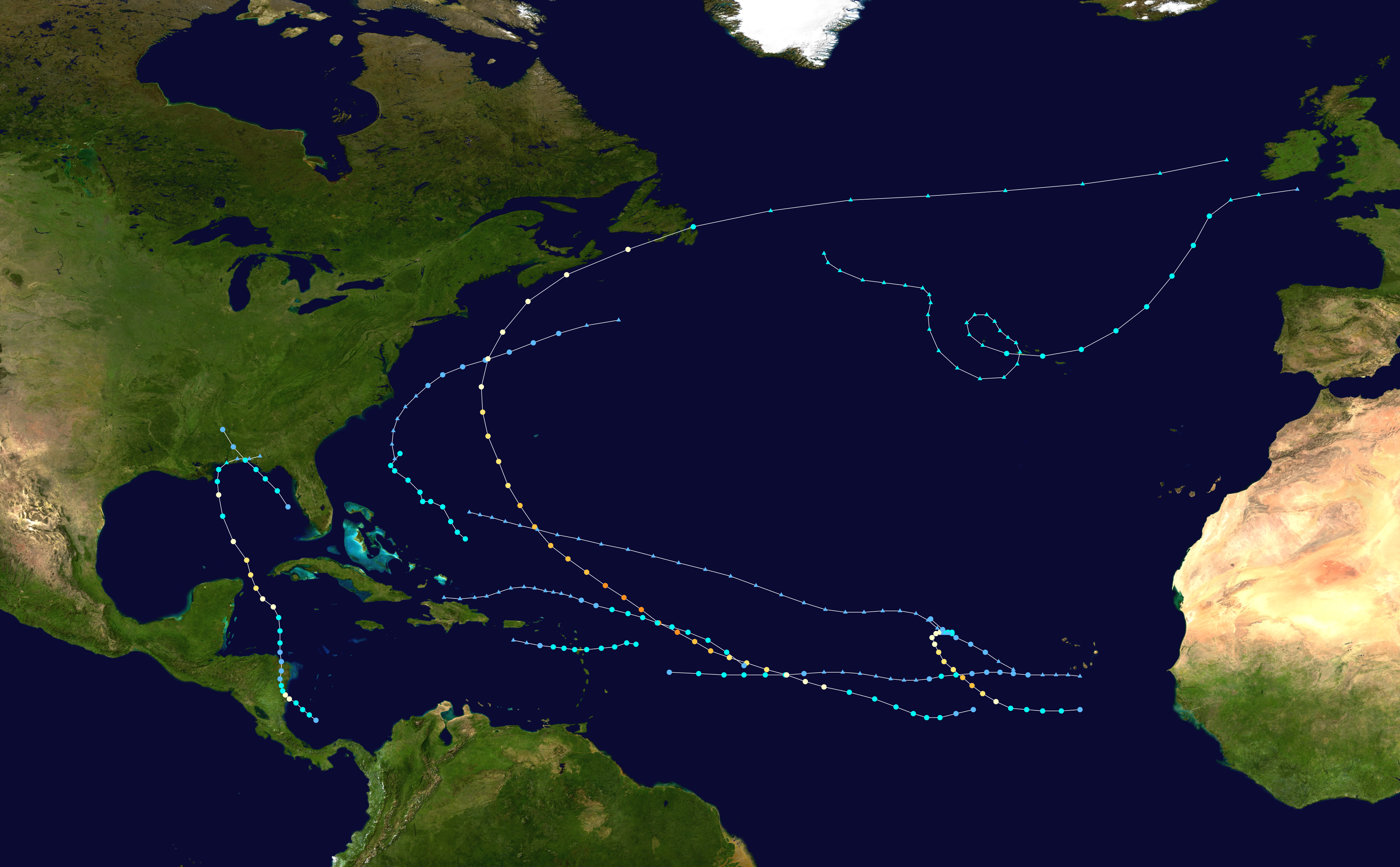
2009 Atlantic hurricane season summary map

The North Atlantic featured a below-average event in tropical cyclone formation that produced only 11 tropical cyclones, 9 named storms, 3 hurricanes, and 2 major hurricanes. Like a typical Atlantic hurricane season, it officially began on Monday, June 1, 2009, and ended on Monday, November 30, 2009. These dates conventionally delimit the period of each year when most tropical cyclones develop in the Atlantic basin. Activity began slightly early when Tropical Depression One developed on May 28, marking the third and last consecutive season with a pre-season storm. The final storm, Hurricane Ida, dissipated on November 10. Hurricane Bill, the first hurricane, major hurricane, and most intense hurricane was a powerful Cape Verde-type hurricane that affected areas from the Leeward Islands to Newfoundland. With only 11 tropical depressions and 9 named storms, the 2009 season featured the lowest number of tropical cyclones since the 1997 season, and only one system, Claudette, made landfall in the United States. Forming from the interaction of a tropical wave and an upper-level low, Claudette made landfall on the Florida Panhandle with maximum sustained winds of 45 miles per hour (72 km/h) before quickly dissipating over Alabama. The storm killed two people and caused $228,000 (2009 USD) in damage. Overall, the season's activity was reflected with a very low cumulative accumulated cyclone energy (ACE) rating of only 53, the lowest since 1997. Because of the low number of storms in the 2009 season, many of which were weak, short-lived, and/or very disorganized, the overall ACE value was ranked as below-average, totaling under 66. Being the most intense hurricane, Hurricane Bill was responsible for the ACE value for August being 30% above average. ACE is, broadly speaking, a measure of the power of the hurricane multiplied by the length of time it existed, so storms that last a long time, as well as particularly strong hurricanes, have high ACEs. ACE is only calculated for full advisories on tropical systems at or exceeding 34 knots (39 mph; 63 km/h) or tropical storm strength. Subtropical cyclones are excluded from the total.

=== Eastern & Central Pacific Oceans ===
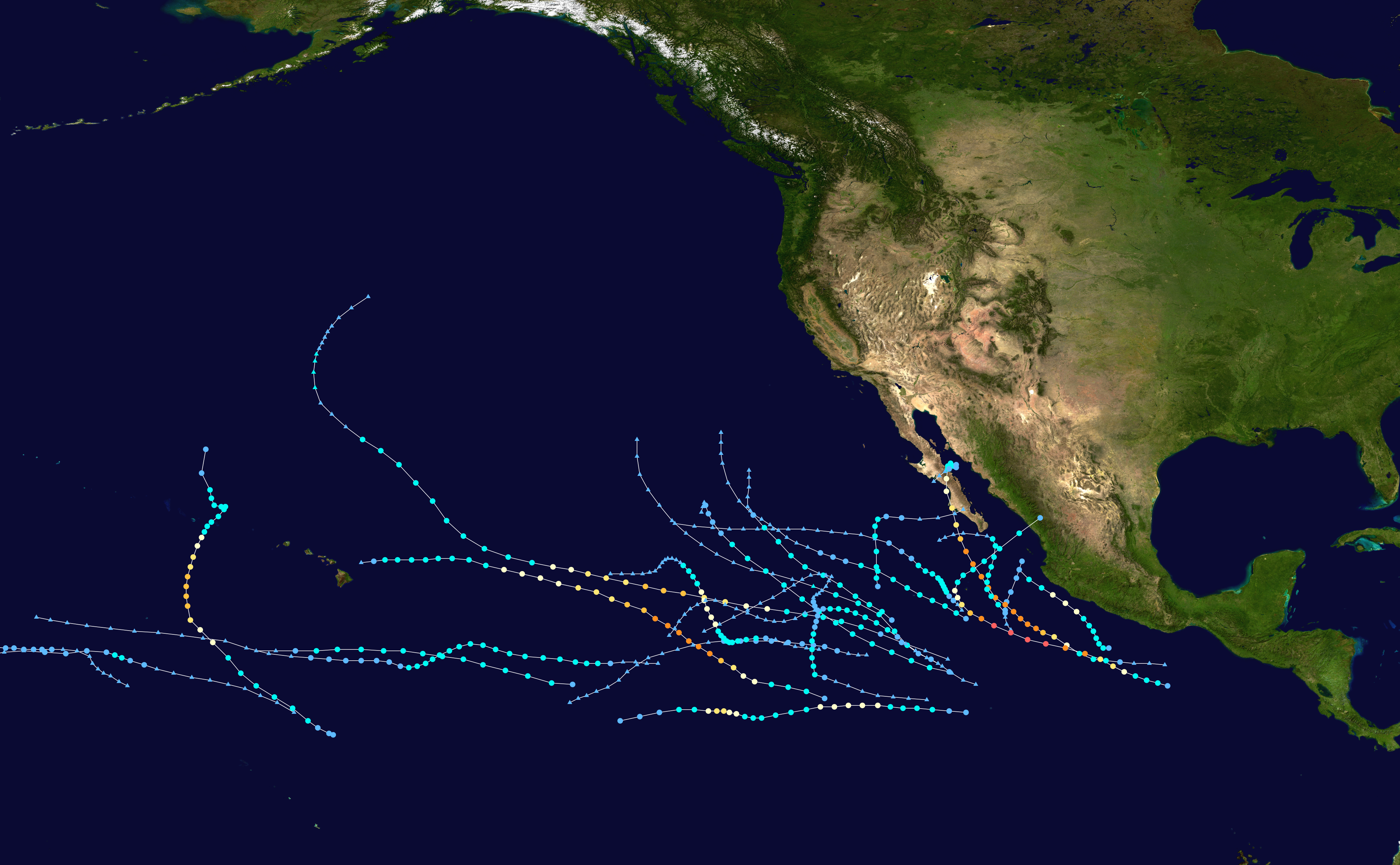
2009 Pacific hurricane season summary map

The Eastern and Central Pacific featured their most active Pacific hurricane season since 1994. The season officially started on Friday, May 15, 2009, in the East Pacific Ocean, and on Monday, June 1, 2009, in the Central Pacific; they both ended on Monday, November 30, 2009. These dates conventionally delimit the period of each year when most tropical cyclones form in the Eastern and Central Pacific basins. However, the formation of tropical cyclones is possible at any time of the year. There were no off-season storms, as the season began relatively late, and ended very early. The accumulated cyclone energy (ACE) index for the 2009 Pacific hurricane season was 117.09 units in the Eastern Pacific and 9.905 units in the Central Pacific. The total ACE in the basin combined is 126.995 units. Broadly speaking, ACE is a measure of the power of a tropical or subtropical storm multiplied by the length of time it existed. It is only calculated for full advisories on specific tropical and subtropical systems reaching or exceeding wind speeds of 39 miles per hour (63 km/h). The season, however, was characterized as "near-normal", featuring 17 named storms 8 hurricanes and 5 major hurricanes. The central Pacific experienced above-average activity with three additional storms forming west of 140°W and three more crossing over from the eastern Pacific. The overall number of storms led to a relative lull in activity experienced over the previous decade. During the course of the year, large-scale factors such as an El Niño and two Madden–Julian oscillations greatly contributed to the changed pattern. The season's activity, east of 140°W, was reflected with a near-average cumulative accumulated cyclone energy (ACE) rating of 100, roughly 94% of the 30-year median. ACE, again, is, broadly speaking, a measure of the power of the hurricane multiplied by the length of time it existed, so storms that last a long time, as well as particularly strong hurricanes, have high ACEs. ACE is only calculated for full advisories on tropical systems at or exceeding 34 knots (39 mph; 63 km/h) or tropical storm strength.

=== Western Pacific Ocean ===
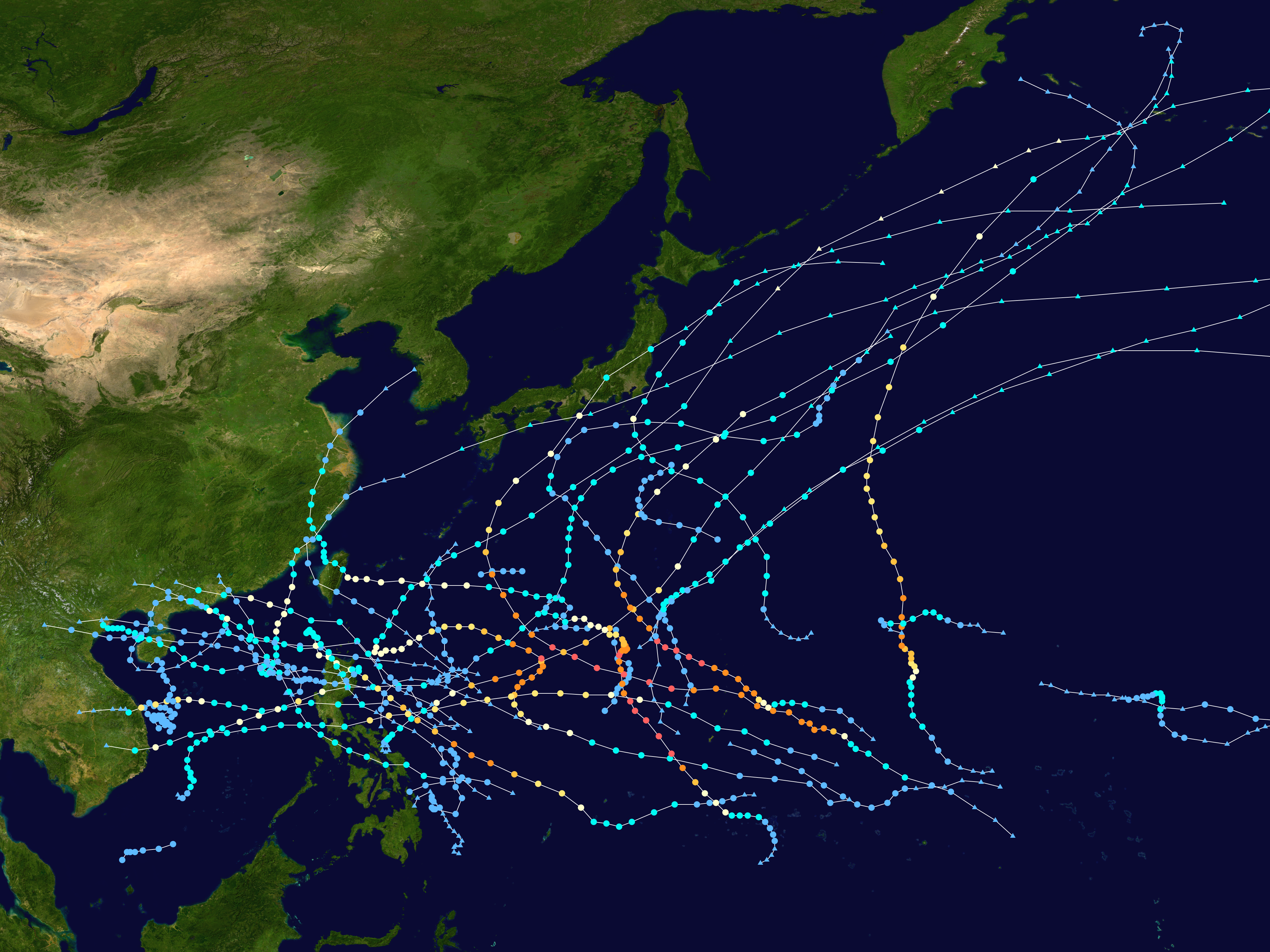
2009 Pacific typhoon season summary map

The Western Pacific featured a below average event that spawned only 22 named storms, 13 typhoons, and five super typhoons. It was also recognized as the deadliest season in the Philippines for decades. The first half of the season was very quiet whereas the second half of the season was extremely active. The season's first named storm, Kujira, developed on May 3 while the season's last named storm, Nida, dissipated on December 3. Nida was the most intense of the whole year worldwide.

=== North Indian Ocean ===
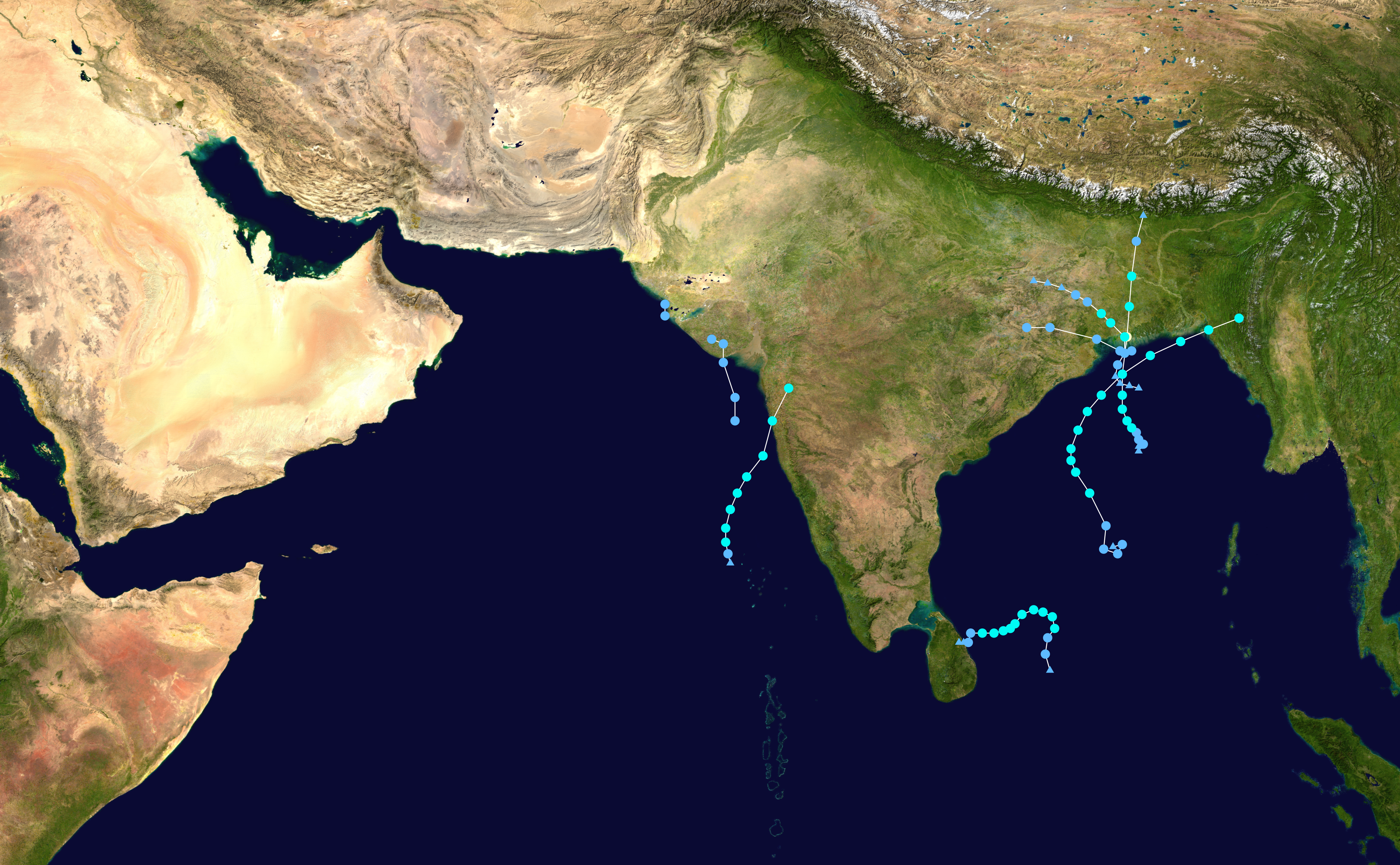
2009 Pacific hurricane season summary map

The North Indian Ocean featured a generally below average event in the annual cycle of tropical cyclone formation. It featured 8 depressions, 6 deep depressions, 4 cyclonic storms, and 1 severe cyclonic storm. No classifications higher. The North Indian Ocean cyclone season has no official bounds, but cyclones tend to form between April and December, with peaks in May and November. These dates conventionally delimit the period of each year when most tropical cyclones form in the northern Indian Ocean.

== Systems ==
There have been 128 tropical disturbances that have formed in 2009, marking an above-average year in tropical cyclone formation throughout the world. One was believed to have formed in the South Atlantic Ocean in late January, and was unofficially added in the 2009 advisories. 82 further intensified to tropical storms, and each received named from each tropical cyclone agency.

=== January ===
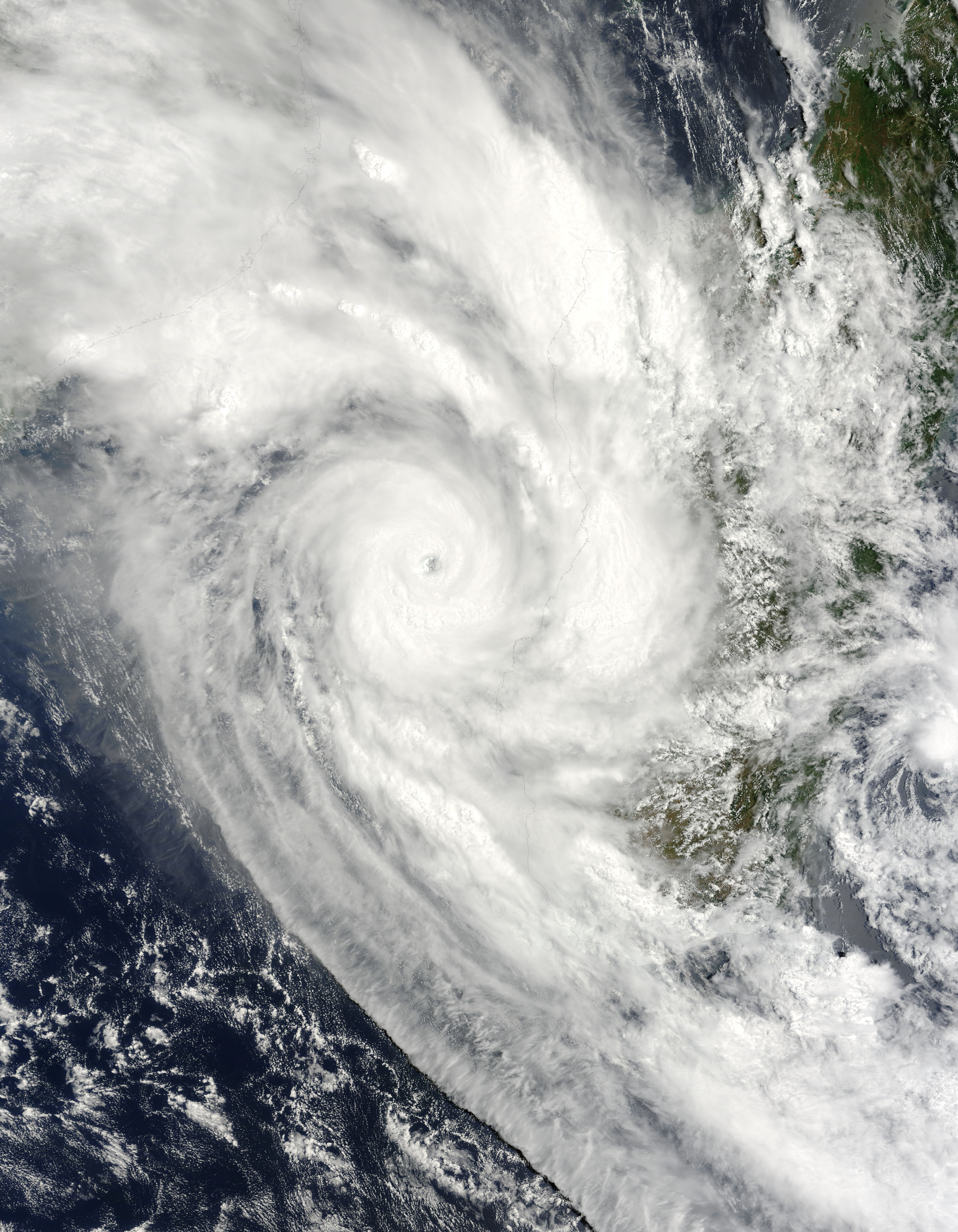
Cyclone Fanele

During January 2009, a total of 14 tropical cyclones formed, while 8 were named. The Cyclone Fanele was the most intense of the month, reaching category 4 on the SSHWS scale, with a barometric pressure of 930 mbar. The other storms were relatively weak, with a force equivalent to a tropical storm. A rare subtropical system was reported in the southern Atlantic, affecting the southern coasts of Brazil and Uruguay. No major damage or death was reported.

Tropical cyclones formed in January 2009
Storm name	Dates active	Max wind km/h (mph)	Pressure (hPa)	Areas affected	Damage (USD)	Deaths	Refs
Auring	January 3–6	45 (30)	1006	Philippines	$498 thousand	2	
04F	January 4–14	Unspecified	1001	Fiji	$64.2 million	12	
Dongo	January 7–12	95 (60)	984	None	None	None	
Charlotte	January 10–12	85 (50)	986	Northern Territory, Cape York Peninsula	$15 million	None	
05F	January 11–14	55 (35)	999	None	None	None	
07U	January 11–12	35 (25)	1000	None	None	None	
Eric	January 16–22	95 (60)	991	Madagascar	Minimal	2	
Fanele	January 17–22	185 (115)	930	Madagascar	Unknown	10	
06F	January 19–23	55 (35)	1005	None	None	None	
07F	January 23–25	65 (40)	1006	None	None	None	
Hettie	January 24–31	65 (40)	995	None	None	None	
Dominic	January 24–27	100 (65)	976	Kimberley, Pilbara	Unknown	None	
01Q	January 29 – February 1	Unspecified	Unspecified	Brazil (Rio de Janeiro), Uruguay	Unknown	Unknown	
Ellie	January 30 – February 4	75 (45)	988	Cape York	$69.5 million	None	

=== February ===
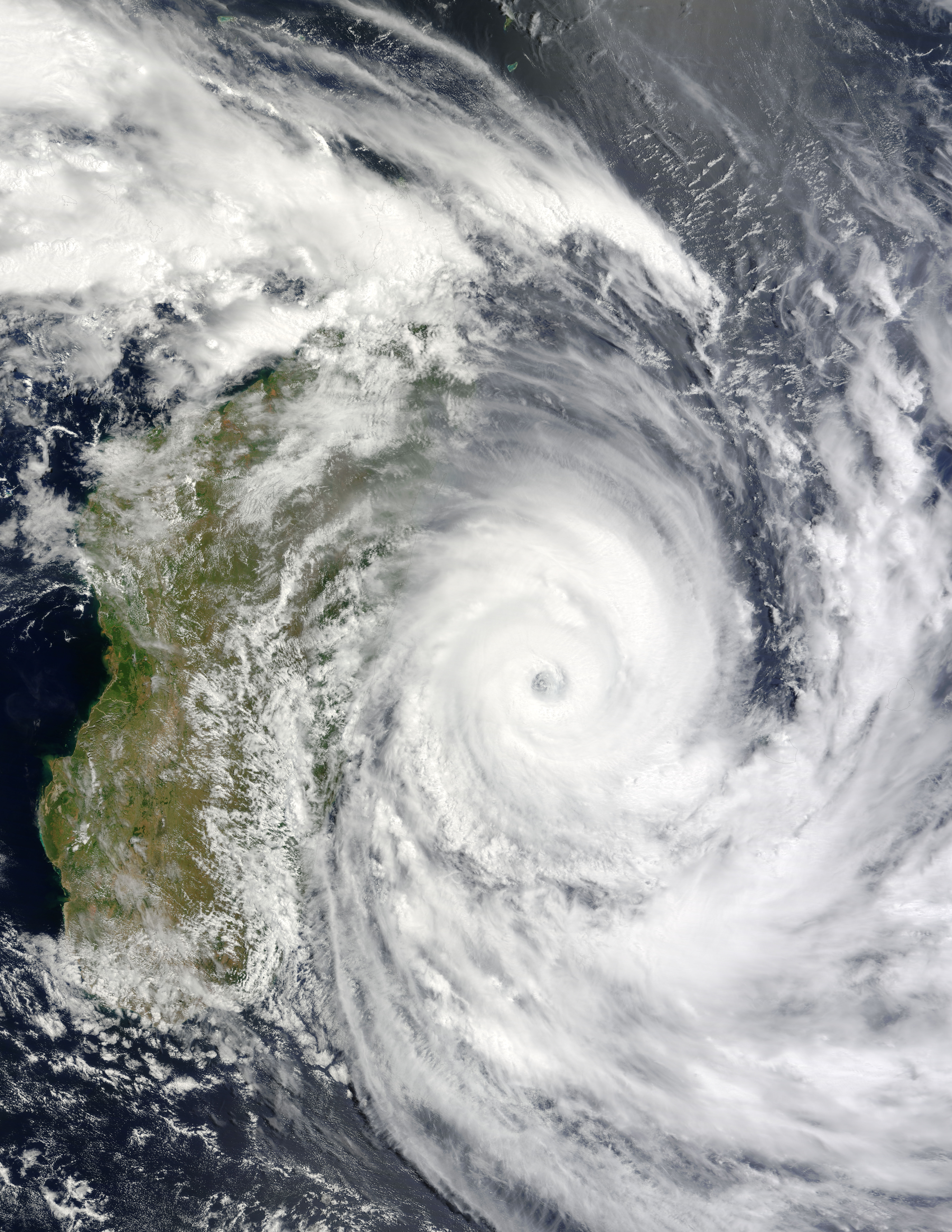
Cyclone Gael

February was moderately active

Tropical cyclones formed in February 2009
Storm name	Dates active	Max wind km/h (mph)	Pressure (hPa)	Areas affected	Damage (USD)	Deaths	Refs
Gael	February 1 – 9	185 (115)	930	Madagascar	Unknown	2	
09F	February 1 – 5	55 (35)	998	New Caledonia	Unknown	Unknown	
Freddy	February 3 – 13	85 (50)	992	None	None	None	
11U	February 4 – 6	Unspecified	Unspecified	None	None	None	
12U	February 11 – 17	<35 (<25)	Unspecified	Western Australia	Unknown	None	
Bising	February 12 – 13	45 (30)	1002	Philippines	None	None	
Innis	February 13 – 18	75 (45)	990	Vanuatu, New Caledonia	Minimal	1	
14U	February 23 – March 2	<35 (<25)	Unspecified	Western Australia	Unknown	None	
Hina	February 20 – 26	105 (65)	976	None	None	None	
Gabrielle	February 27 – March 6	65 (40)	996	None	None	None	

=== March ===
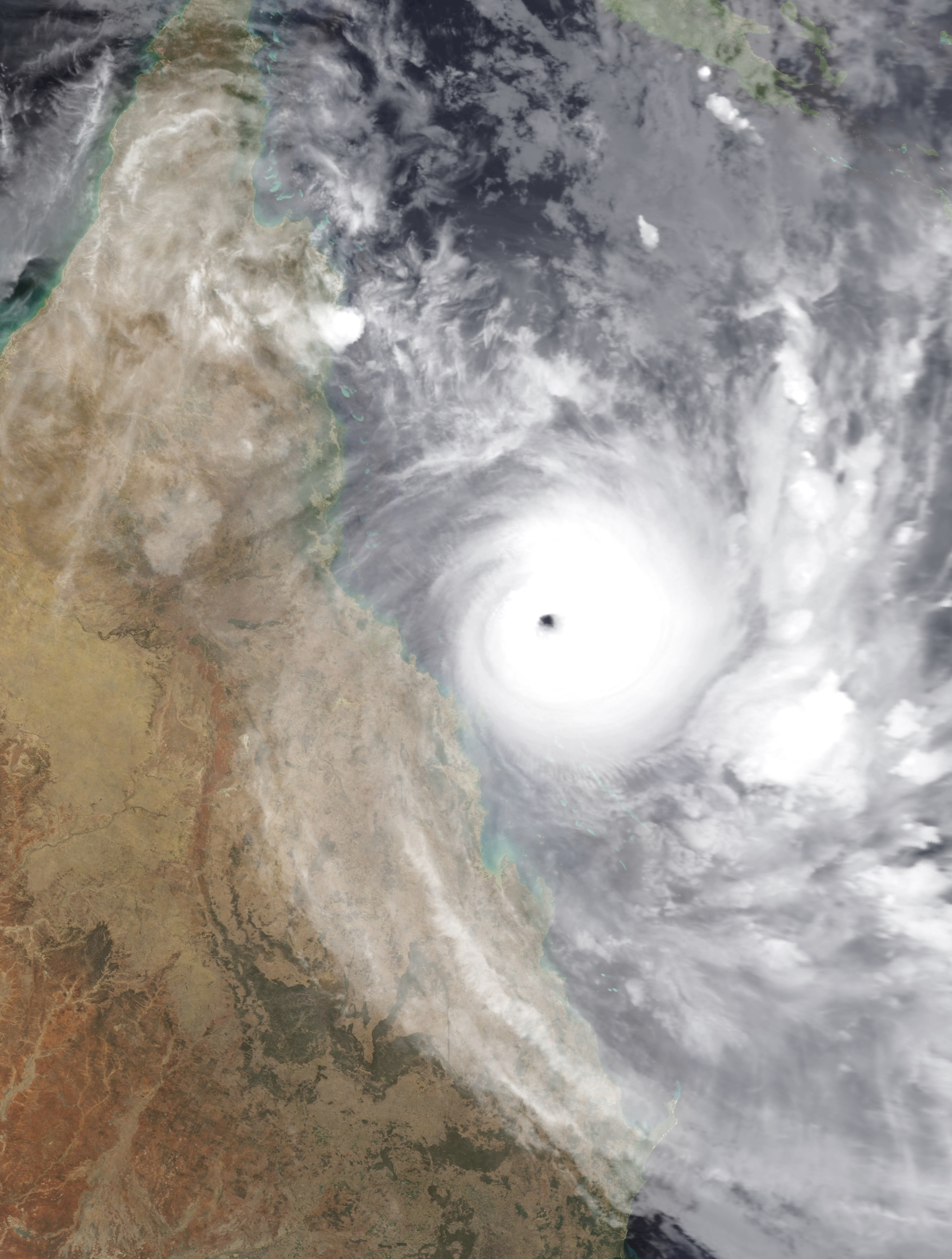
Cyclone Hamish

March was moderately active

Tropical cyclones formed in March 2009
Storm name	Dates active	Max wind km/h (mph)	Pressure (hPa)	Areas affected	Damage (USD)	Deaths	Refs
Hamish	March 4–11	215 (130)	924	Queensland	$38.8 million	2	
10	March 6–10	55 (35)	997	None	None	None	
Joni	March 10–14	95 (60)	980	Cook Islands	Minor	Unknown	
Ilsa	March 12–27	165 (105)	958	None	None	None	
Ken	March 16–19	95 (60)	985	None	Unknown	None	
19U	March 16–20	45 (30)	999	None	None	None	
Izilda	March 22–27	110 (70)	978	None	None	None	
Jasper	March 22–30	100 (60)	980	New Caledonia	Minimal	None	
21U	March 23–31	55 (35)	1002	None	None	None	
Lin	March 31 – April 7	110 (70)	975	Fiji, Tonga	$920 thousand	None	

=== April ===
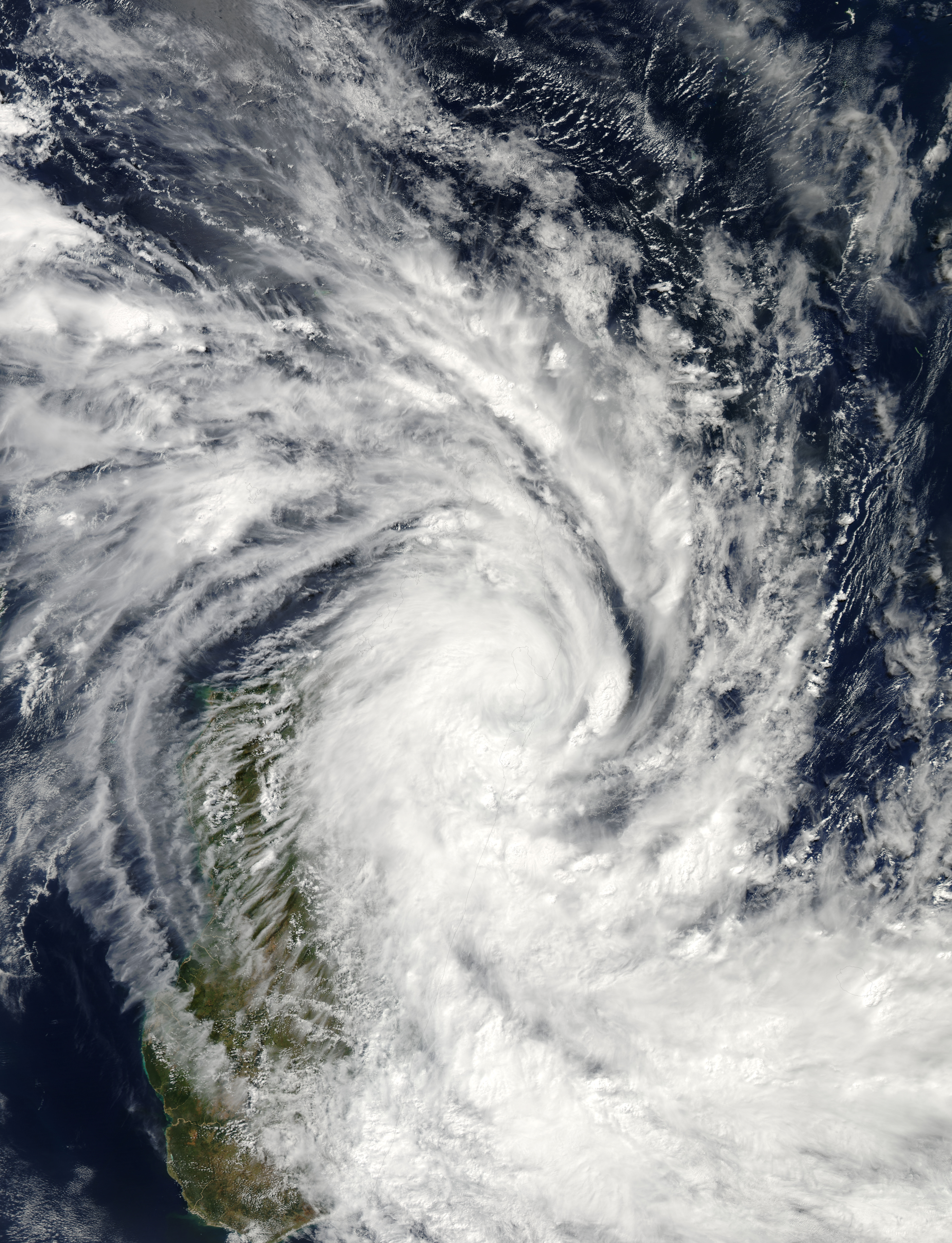
Tropical Storm Jade

April was relatively inactive,

Tropical cyclones formed in April 2009
Storm name	Dates active	Max wind km/h (mph)	Pressure (hPa)	Areas affected	Damage (USD)	Deaths	Refs
Jade	April 3 – 10	110 (70)	975	Madagascar	Unknown	15	
15F	April 7 – 10	35 (25)	1004	None	None	None	
22U	April 4 – 11	35 (25)	1004	None	None	None	
Bijli	April 14 – 17	75 (45)	996	Eastern India, Bangladesh, Myanmar	Unknown	3	
Kirrily	April 18 – May 1	65 (40)	999	Indonesia	Minimal	None	
Crising	April 30 – May 1	55 (35)	Unspecified	Philippines	None	None	

=== May ===
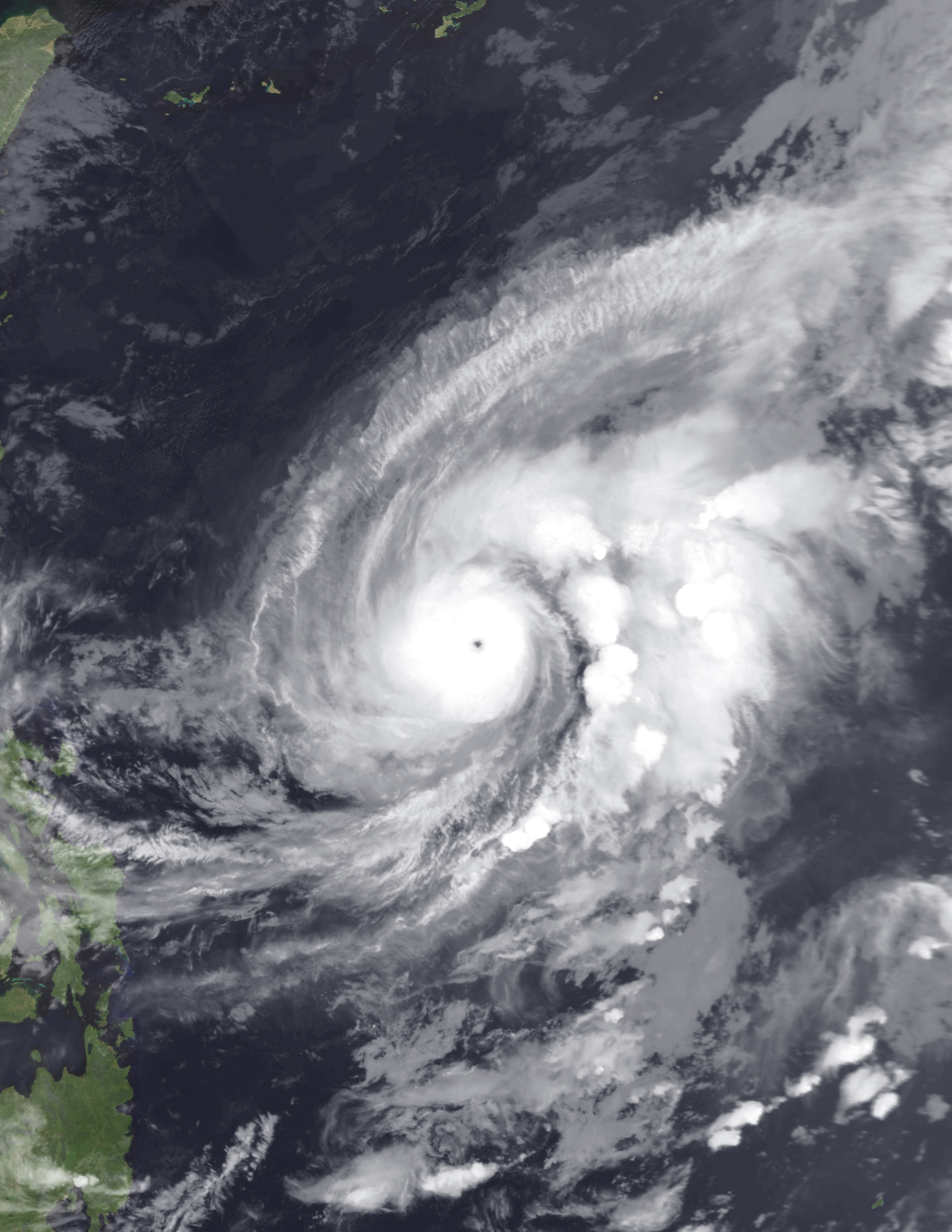
Typhoon Kujira

May was relatively inactive,

Tropical cyclones formed in May 2009
Storm name	Dates active	Max wind km/h (mph)	Pressure (hPa)	Areas affected	Damage (USD)	Deaths	Refs
Kujira (Dante)	May 1 – 7	155 (100)	940	Philippines, Russian Far East	$27 million	28	
TD	May 1 – 4	55 (35)	1004	None	None	None	
Chan-hom (Emong)	May 2 – 9	120 (75)	975	Vietnam, Philippines, Ryukyu Islands	$26.1 million	60	
24U	May 10 – 18	35 (25)	1009	None	None	None	
Aila	May 23 – 26	110 (70)	968	India, Bangladesh	$553 million	330	
One	May 28 – 29	55 (35)	1006	North Carolina	None	None	

=== June ===
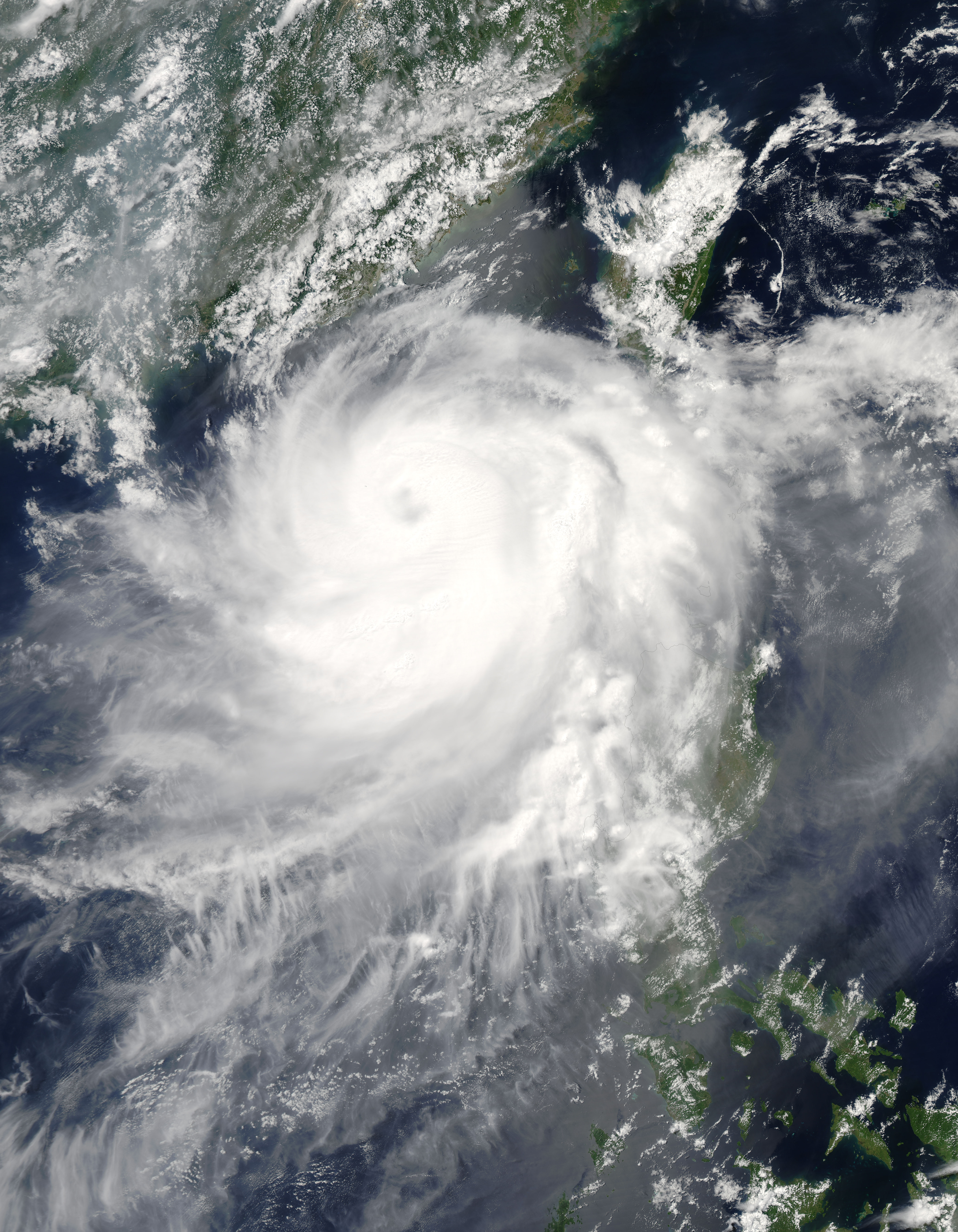
Tropical Storm Linfa

June was relatively inactive with six tropical cyclones and three tropical storm-equivalent cyclones forming. Hurricane Andres gave the 2009 Pacific hurricane season a late start when it formed on June 21 (the latest start on record until the record was beaten exactly a decade later when Alvin formed on June 25, 2019, then later in 2023 and 2024 with Adrian and Aletta forming on June 27, 2023, and July 4, 2024, respectively).

Tropical cyclones formed in June 2009
Storm name	Dates active	Max wind km/h (mph)	Pressure (hPa)	Areas affected	Damage (USD)	Deaths	Refs
Linfa	June 14–22	110 (70)	975	Philippines, Taiwan, China	$105 million	7	
One-E	June 18–19	55 (35)	1003	Western Mexico, Northwest Mexico	Unknown	None	
Andres	June 21–24	130 (80)	984	Southwestern Mexico, Western Mexico, Honduras	$2.31 thousand	3, 2 indirect	
Nangka (Feria)	June 22–27	75 (45)	994	Philippines, China	$54 thousand	6	
ARB 01	June 23–24	45 (30)	998	India	Unknown	9	
ARB 02	June 25–26	45 (30)	998	India	Unknown	None	

=== July ===
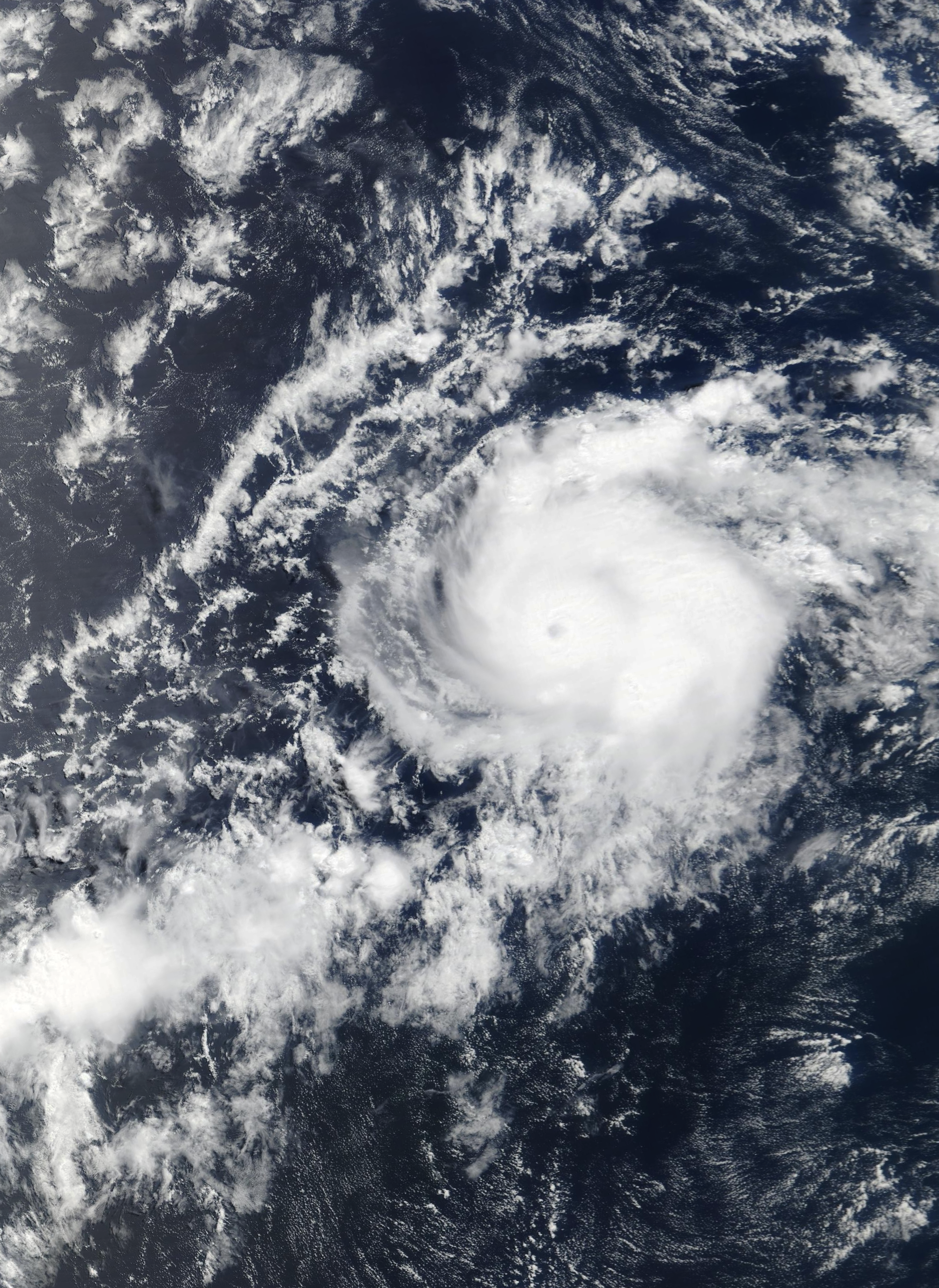
Hurricane Carlos

July was slightly inactive in terms of intensity per tropical cyclones, and slightly active in terms of number of tropical cyclones that formed, with nine. Seven were tropical storm equivalent, and only two were hurricane or typhoon equivalent tropical cyclones. No majors. Although Hurricane Carlos was the most intense of the month, none of the tropical cyclones caused any form of severe destruction. Over 50 people were killed, however, a deadly exception.

Tropical cyclones formed in July 2009
Storm name	Dates active	Max wind km/h (mph)	Pressure (hPa)	Areas affected	Damage (USD)	Deaths	Refs
Blanca	July 6–9	85 (50)	998	Western Mexico, California	Unknown	None	
Souledor (Gorio)	July 9–13	65 (40)	992	Philippines, China, Vietnam	$9 million	19	
Carlos	July 10–16	165 (105)	971	None	None	None	
06W (Huaning)	July 11–14	55 (35)	1000	Taiwan, China	None	None	
Dolores	July 15–16	95 (60)	997	None	None	None	
Molave (Isang)	July 15–19	120 (75)	975	Philippines, Taiwan, China	Moderate	4	
BOB 03	July 20–21	55 (35)	988	India	Unknown	43	
Lana	July 30 – August 2	100 (65)	995	None	None	None	
Goni (Jolina)	July 30 – August 9	75 (45)	988	Philippines, China, Vietnam	Minor	8	

=== August ===
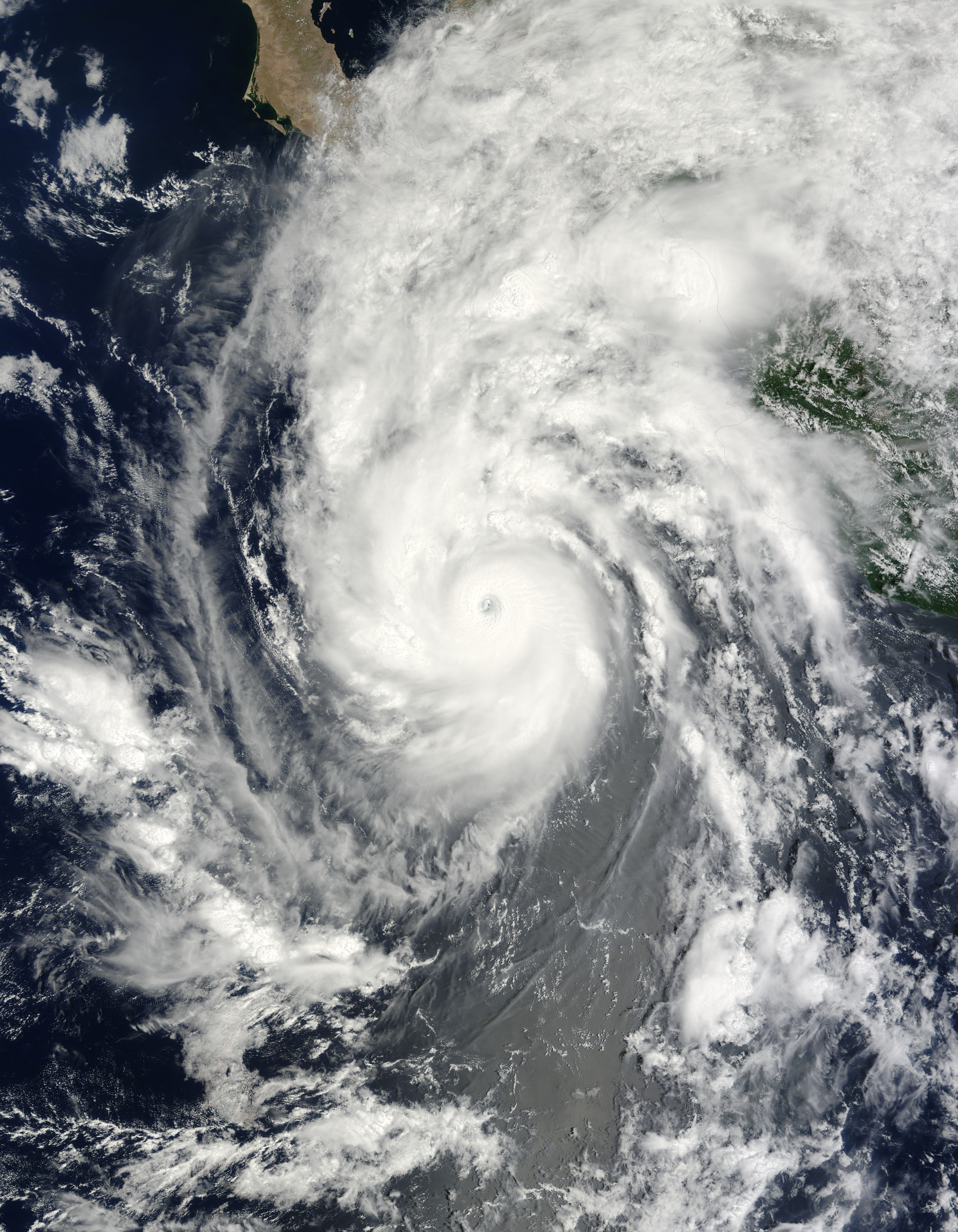
Hurricane Jimena

August was the most active month the year that 21 tropical cyclones formed throughout the world. 16 attained sustained wind speeds of 64 kilometres per hour (40 mph) or greater. Tropical Storm Ana became the first named storm of the very inactive 2009 Atlantic hurricane season, when it formed on August 11, one of that latest first named storms on record since Alex of 2004. Typhoon Morakot (Kiko) was the deadliest tropical cyclone of the year, killing 789 total. Hurricane Jimena became the most intense of the month in the latter portion of August.

Tropical cyclones formed in August 2009
Storm name	Dates active	Max wind km/h (mph)	Pressure (hPa)	Areas affected	Damage (USD)	Deaths	Refs
Morakot (Kiko)	August 2–11	140 (85)	945	Philippines, Japan, Taiwan, China, Korea	$6.2 billion	789	
Enrique	August 3–7	100 (65)	994	None	None	None	
Felicia	August 3–11	230 (145)	935	Hawaii	Minimal	None	
Etau	August 8–14	75 (45)	992	Japan	$87.5 million	28	
Nine-E	August 9–11	55 (35)	1006	None	None	None	
Ana	August 11–16	65 (40)	1003	Lesser Antilles, Puerto Rico, Hispaniola, Cuba, The Bahamas	Minimal	None	
Maka	August 11–18	65 (40)	1006	None	None	None	
Guillermo	August 12–19	205 (125)	954	Hawaii	None	None	
Bill	August 15–24	215 (130)	943	Leeward Islands, Puerto Rico, Hispaniola, United States East Coast, BermudaAtlantic Canada (Newfoundland), British Isles	$46.2 million	2	
Claudette	August 16–18	95 (60)	1005	Southeastern United States (Florida)	$350,000	2	
Vamco	August 16–26	165 (105)	945	None	None	None	
01	August 18–20	35 (20)	1004	None	None	None	
TD	August 20–21	55 (35)	1002	Japan	None	None	
Hilda	August 22–28	100 (65)	995	None	None	None	
Ignacio	August 24–27	85 (50)	999	None	None	None	
TD	August 25–27	55 (35)	1004	None	None	None	
Danny	August 26–29	95 (60)	1006	North Carolina, Northeastern United States, Atlantic Canada	Minimal	1	
Jimena	August 28 – September 4	250 (155)	931	Western Mexico, Northwest Mexico (Baja California Sur), Southwestern United States	$211 million	5, 2 indirect	
Two-C	August 28 – September 2	55 (35)	1004	None	None	None	
Krovanh	August 28 – September 1	110 (70)	975	Japan	None	None	
Kevin	August 29 – September 1	85 (50)	1000	None	None	None	

=== September ===
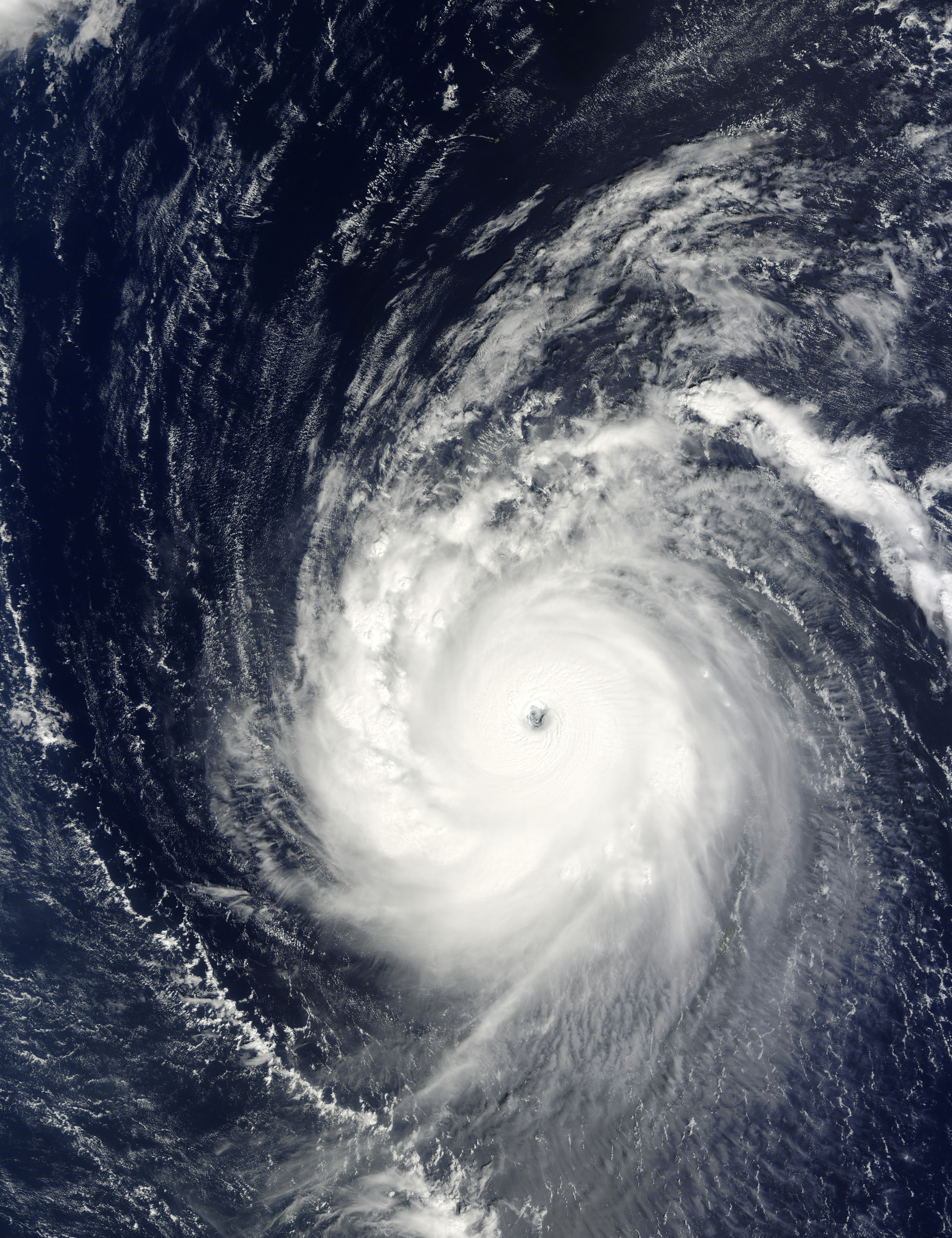
Typhoon Melor

September was the second-most active of the year.

Tropical cyclones formed in September 2009
Storm name	Dates active	Max wind km/h (mph)	Pressure (hPa)	Areas affected	Damage (USD)	Deaths	Refs
Erika	September 1–3	85 (50)	1004	Lesser Antilles, Puerto Rico, Dominican Republic	$35,000	None	
Dujuan (Labuyo)	September 1–10	95 (60)	980	Mariana Islands	None	None	
TD	September 3–9	45 (30)	1000	Vietnam	$2.52 million	6	
BOB 04	September 5–7	55 (35)	990	India (West Bengal)	Unknown	1	
Fred	September 7–12	195 (120)	958	Cape Verde	None	None	
Linda	September 7–11	130 (80)	985	None	None	None	
Mujigae (Maring)	September 8–12	75 (45)	990	Philippines, China, Vietnam	$14.6 million	11	
Koppu (Nando)	September 12–16	120 (75)	975	Philippines, China	Moderate	None	
Choi-wan	September 12–20	195 (120)	915	Mariana Islands	Minor	None	
Marty	September 16–19	75 (45)	1002	None	None	None	
02	September 18–20	35 (20)	1008	None	None	None	
Nora	September 23–25	95 (60)	997	None	None	None	
TD	September 23–26	45 (30)	1006	Mariana Islands	Minor	None	
Eight	September 25–26	55 (35)	1008	None	None	None	
Ketsana (Ondoy)	September 25–30	130 (80)	960	Philippines, Vietnam, Laos, Cambodia, Thailand	$1.09 billion	710	
18W	September 26–30	55 (30)	1000	Mariana Islands, Caroline Islands	None	None	
Parma (Pepeng)	September 27 – October 14	185 (115)	930	Caroline Islands, Philippines, Taiwan, China, Vietnam	$662 million	500	
Melor (Quedan)	September 29 – October 8	205 (125)	910	Caroline Islands, Mariana Islands, Japan	$1.5 billion	3	

=== October ===
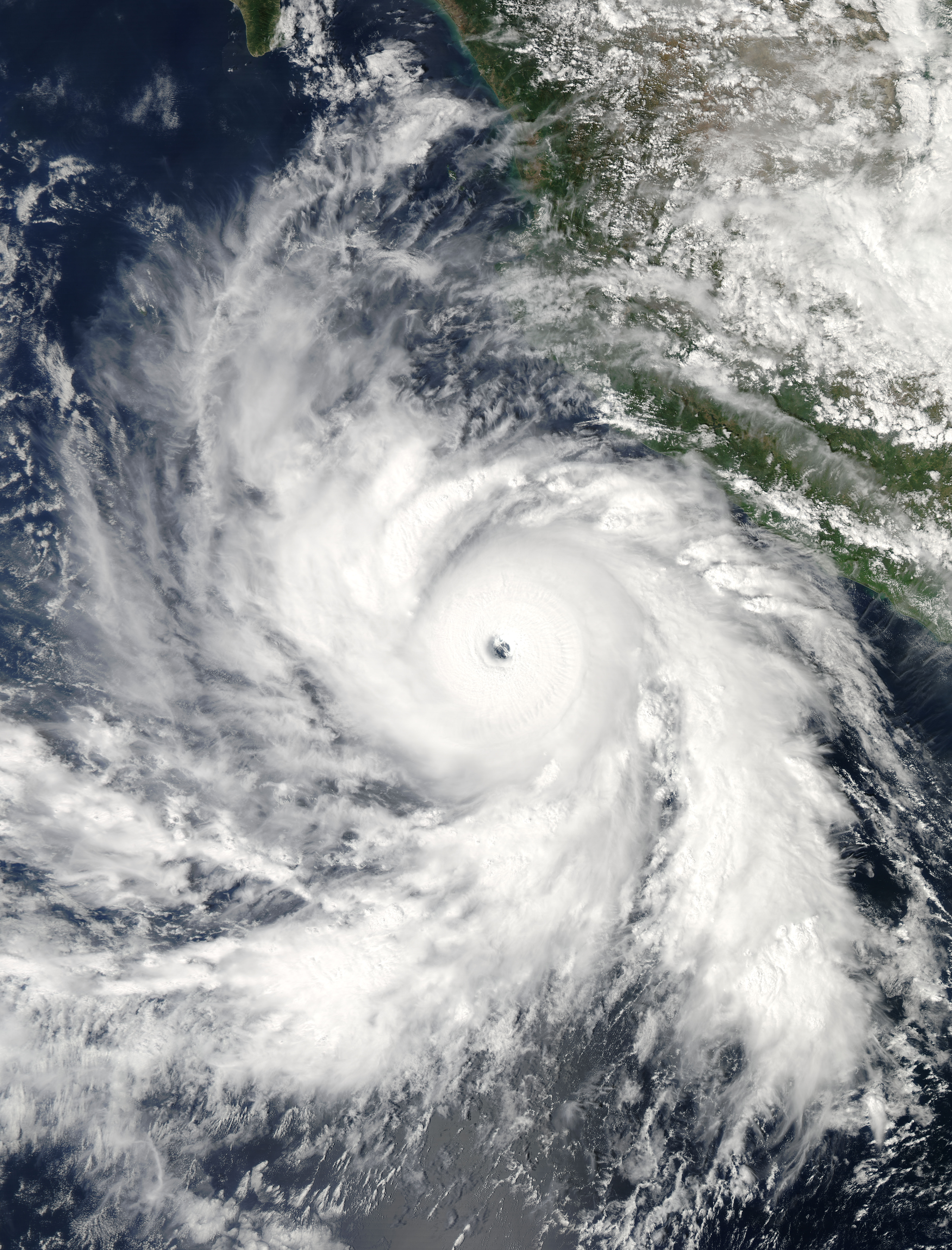
Hurricane Rick

October was inactive in terms of tropical cyclones, but it was slightly active in terms of intensity in hPa/mbar., especially towards the end of the month. 10 tropical cyclones formed in October 2009. 9 of those attained storm intensities and were named. Hurricane Rick was the third-most intense Pacific hurricane on record, as well as the second-most intense of 2009 worldwide. The 2009 Pacific hurricane season ended slightly earlier than usual when Hurricane Neki dissipated on October 27

Tropical cyclones formed in October 2009
Storm name	Dates active	Max wind km/h (mph)	Pressure (hPa)	Areas affected	Damage (USD)	Deaths	Refs
Olaf	October 1–3	75 (45)	996	Baja California Peninsula	None	None	
Grace	October 4–6	100 (65)	986	Azores, Portugal, British Isles	Minimal	None	
Henri	October 6–8	85 (50)	1005	Lesser Antilles, Greater Antilles	None	None	
Nepartak	October 8 – 13	85 (50)	992	Mariana Islands	None	None	
Patricia	October 11–14	95 (60)	996	Baja California Peninsula, Northwest Mexico	None	None	
Lupit (Ramil)	October 14–27	175 (110)	930	Caroline Islands, Philippines, Japan	Minor	None	
Rick	October 15–21	285 (180)	906	Western Mexico (Sinaloa), Northwest Mexico, Southern United States	$14.6 million	3, 1 indirect	
TD	October 16–20	45 (30)	1002	Vietnam, China	None	None	
Neki	October 18–27	205 (125)	950	Hawaii	None	None	
Mirinae (Santi)	October 25 – November 3	150 (90)	955	Caroline Islands, Mariana Islands, Philippines, Vietnam, Cambodia, Laos, Thailand	$295 million	162	

=== November ===
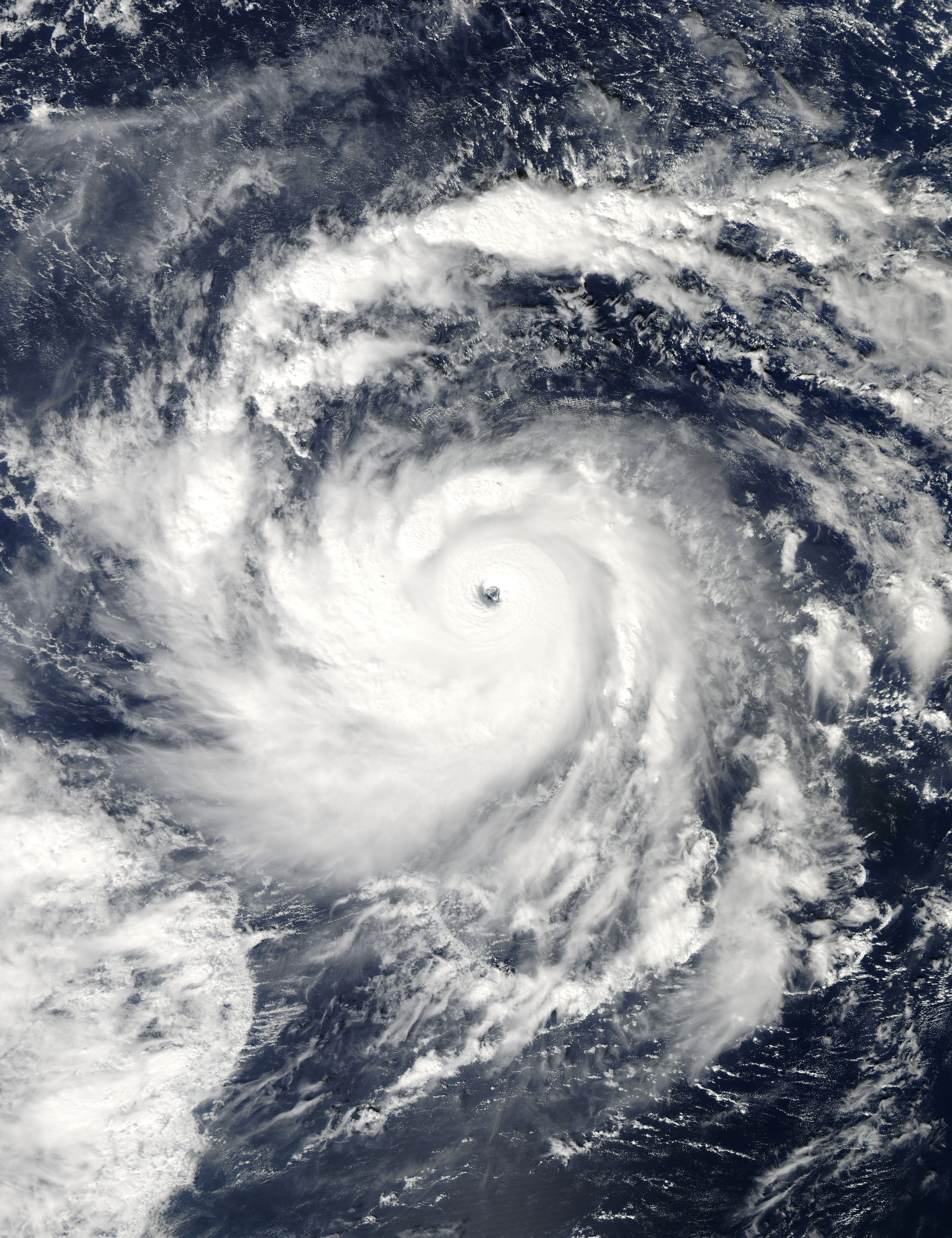
Typhoon Nida

November was relatively inactive with only 10 tropical cyclones forming and 5 attaining tropical storm intensities. The inactive 2009 Atlantic hurricane season ended when Hurricane Ida dissipated on November 10 (it transitioned to a Nor'easter just after, so it ended when "Nor'Ida" dissipated) Despite two tropical disturbances forming in August and September, the 2009–10 South-West Indian Ocean cyclone season actually didn't see a named tropical storm form until November 13. The start to the season was pretty intense when Cyclone Anja peaked at 950 hPa. Typhoon Nida was the most intense of the year, peaking at a pressure of 905 hPa, just ahead of Hurricane Rick of the previous month.

Tropical cyclones formed in November 2009
Storm name	Dates active	Max wind km/h (mph)	Pressure (hPa)	Areas affected	Damage (USD)	Deaths	Refs
24W (Tino)	November 1–2	55 (35)	1006	Philippines	None	None	
Ida	November 4–10	165 (105)	975	Central America (Nicaragua), Cayman Islands, Yucatán Peninsula, Cuba, Southeastern United States	$11.4 million	4	
Phyan	November 9–12	85 (50)	988	India	$64.9 million	28	
25W	November 7–10	55 (35)	1000	None	None	None	
03	November 7–10	45 (30)	1002	None	None	None	
Anja	November 13–18	165 (105)	950	None	None	None	
Bongani	November 22–25	75 (45)	997	Madagascar	None	None	
27W (Urduja)	November 21–24	55 (35)	1002	Philippines	Minor	4	
Nida (Vinta)	November 21 – December 3	215 (130)	905	Caroline Islands, Mariana Islands	Minor	None	
TD	November 24–25	55 (35)	1006	Malaysia, Indonesia, Thailand	None	None	

=== December ===
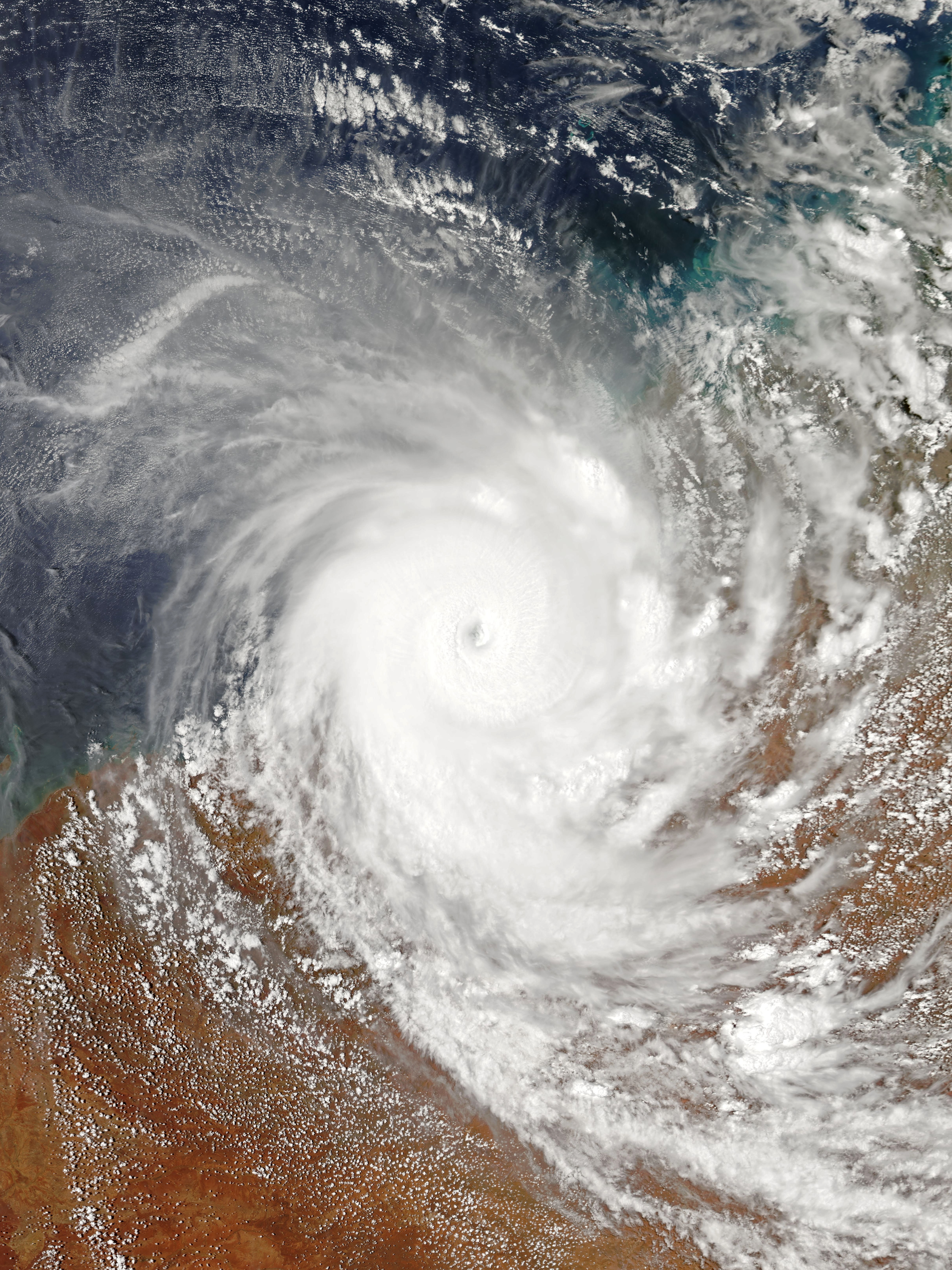
Cyclone Laurence

December was relatively and slightly inactive

Tropical cyclones formed in December 2009
Storm name	Dates active	Max wind km/h (mph)	Pressure (hPa)	Areas affected	Damage (USD)	Deaths	Refs
28W	December 3–5	45 (30)	1000	None	None	None	
Cleo	December 6–14	195 (120)	930	None	None	None	
Mick	December 3–15	110 (70)	975	Fiji	$33 million	3	
02F	December 6–12	Unspecified	1003	None	None	None	
TD	December 7–8	45 (30)	1008	Philippines	None	None	
Laurence	December 8–23	205 (125)	925	Northern Territory, Western Australia	$9 million	None	
Ward	December 10–16	85 (50)	996	Sri Lanka, India	Unknown	None	
David	December 12–25	85 (50)	987	Reunion, Mauritius, Madagascar	None	None	
02U	December 27 – January 6, 2010	45 kilometres per hour (28 mph)	1000	Northern Territory	Unknown	None	

== Global effects ==
There are a total of seven tropical cyclone basins that tropical cyclones typically form in this table, data from all these basins are added.

Season name		Areas affected	Systems formed	Named storms	Hurricane-force tropical cyclones	Damage (2009 USD)	Deaths	Ref.
North Atlantic Ocean (Note: The wind speeds for this tropical cyclone/basin are based on the Saffir Simpson Scale which uses 1-minute sustained winds.)		Lesser Antilles, Greater Antilles, Lucayan Archipelago, Leeward Islands, East Coast of the United States, Atlantic Canada, Southeastern United States, Northeastern United States, Western Europe, Central America, Yucatán Peninsula	11	9	3	~$57.99 million	9	
Eastern and Central Pacific Ocean		Western Mexico, Northwest Mexico, Southwestern Mexico, Southwestern United States, Baja California Peninsula, Hawaii, Central America	23	20	8	$226 million	16	
Western Pacific Ocean (Note: Only systems that formed either before or on December 31, 2025 are counted in the seasonal totals.)		Vietnam, Malaysia, Singapore, Philippines, Cambodia, Laos, China, Macau, Hong Kong, Japan	39	22	15	$11.69 billion	2,572	
North Indian Ocean (Note: The wind speeds for this tropical cyclone/basin are based on the IMD Scale which uses 3-minute sustained winds.)		Eastern India, Bangladesh, Myanmar	8	4	1	$2.13 billion	419	
South-West Indian Ocean	January – June (Note: Only systems that formed either on or after January 1, 2009 are counted in the seasonal totals.) (Note: The wind speeds for this tropical cyclone are based on Météo-France, which uses wind gusts.)	Madagascar, Mauritius, Rodrigues, Tromelin Island, Réunion	8	7	5	Unknown	30	
South-West Indian Ocean	July – December	Madagascar, Mayotte, Comoros, Reunion, Mauritius	7	4	2	Unknown	—N/a	
Australian region	January – June	Broome, Port Hedland, Western Australia, Christmas Island, Cocos Islands, Queensland, Kimberley, Pilbara, Willis Island, New South Wales, Indonesia, Northern Territory	16	8	2	$123.3 million	2	
Australian region	July – December	Northern Territory, Western Australia	2	1	1	$10 million	—N/a	
South Pacific Ocean	January – June	Tonga, Niue, Cook Islands, Samoa, Loyalty Islands, New Caledonia, French Polynesia, Vanuatu, Fiji, Wallis and Futuna, Norfolk Islands, New Zealand	11	5	—N/a	Unknown	—N/a	
South Pacific Ocean	July – December	Fiji	2	1	1	—N/a	—N/a	
South Atlantic Ocean		—N/a	1	—N/a	—N/a	Unknown	—N/a	
Worldwide		(See above)	128 (Note: The sum of the number of systems in each basin will not equal the number shown as the total. This is because when systems move between basins, it creates a discrepancy in the actual number of systems.)	81	38	$14.24 billion	3,048	

== Notes ==
^{1} Only systems that formed either on or after January 1, 2009 are counted in the seasonal totals.

^{2} Only systems that formed either before or on December 31, 2009 are counted in the seasonal totals.

^{3} The wind speeds for this tropical cyclone/basin are based on the IMD Scale which uses 3-minute sustained winds.

^{4} The wind speeds for this tropical cyclone/basin are based on the Saffir Simpson Scale which uses 1-minute sustained winds.

^{5}The wind speeds for this tropical cyclone are based on Météo-France which uses gust winds.

== See also ==
- Tropical cyclones by year
- List of earthquakes in 2009
- Tornadoes of 2009
