= Timeline of the 2009 Pacific typhoon season =

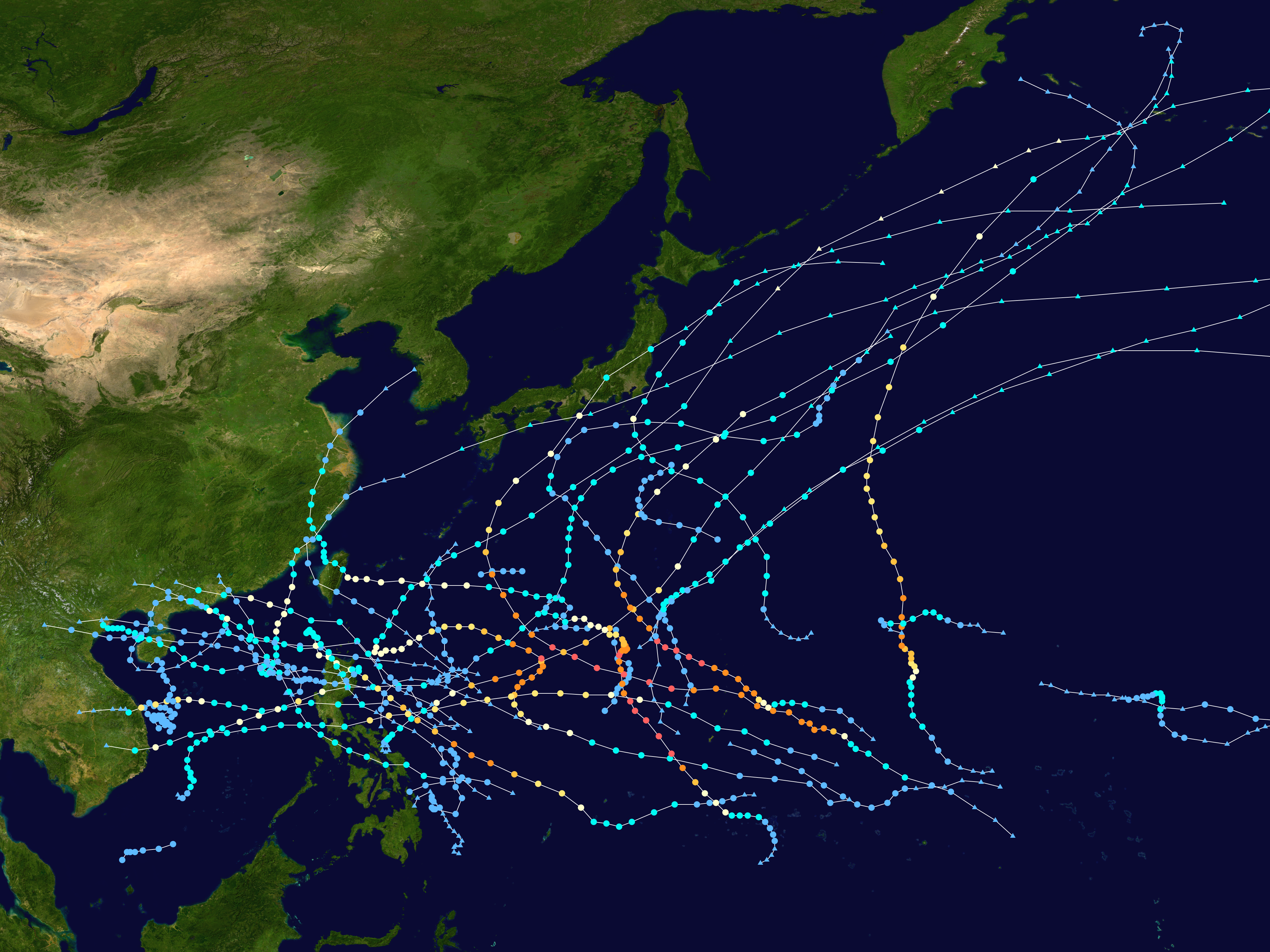
- Season summary map

Season boundaries
- First system formed: January 3, 2009
- Last system dissipated: December 8, 2009

Strongest system
- Name: Nida
- Maximum winds: 215 km/h (130 mph) (10-minute sustained)
- Lowest pressure: 905 hPa (mbar)

Longest lasting system
- Name: Parma
- Duration: 14 days
Storm articles
- Typhoon Kujira (2009)
- Typhoon Chan-hom (2009)
- Tropical Storm Linfa (2009)
- Tropical Storm Soudelor (2009)
- Typhoon Morakot
- Tropical Storm Etau (2009)
- September 2009 Vietnam tropical depression
- Tropical Storm Mujigae (2009)
- Typhoon Koppu (2009)
- Typhoon Choi-wan (2009)
- Typhoon Ketsana
- Tropical Depression 18W (2009)
- Typhoon Parma
- Typhoon Melor (2009)
- Typhoon Lupit (2009)
- Typhoon Mirinae (2009)
- Typhoon Nida (2009)

This timeline documents all of the events of the 2009 Pacific typhoon season which was the period that tropical cyclones formed in the Western Pacific Ocean during 2009, with most of the tropical cyclones forming between May and November. The scope of this article is limited to the Pacific Ocean, north of the equator between 100°E and the International Date Line. Tropical storms that form in the entire Western Pacific basin are assigned a name by the Japan Meteorological Agency. Tropical depressions that form in this basin are given a number with a "W" suffix by the United States' Joint Typhoon Warning Center. In addition, the Philippine Atmospheric, Geophysical and Astronomical Services Administration (PAGASA) assigns names to tropical cyclones (including tropical depressions) that enter or form in the Philippine area of responsibility. These names, however, are not in common use outside of the Philippines.

During the season, a total of 41 systems were designated as Tropical Depressions by either, the Japan Meteorological Agency (JMA), the Philippine Atmospheric, Geophysical and Astronomical Services Administration (PAGASA), the Joint Typhoon Warning Center (JTWC), or other National Meteorological and Hydrological Services such as the China Meteorological Administration and the Hong Kong Observatory. As they run the Regional Specialized Meteorological Centre for the Western Pacific, the JMA assigns names to Tropical Depressions should they intensify into a tropical storm. PAGASA also assign local names to tropical depressions which form within their area of responsibility; however, these names are not in common use outside of PAGASA's area of responsibility.

For the PAGASA, 22 systems formed or entered in their area during 2009, which 12 of them directly made landfall over the Philippines. Tropical Depressions 02C and Maka crossed the International Date Line during August.

== Storms ==
=== January ===
January 1

- 0000 UTC – The 2009 Pacific typhoon season officially begins.

January 3

- 0000 UTC - The JMA reports that a tropical depression has formed about 985 km (612 mi), to the southeast of Manila in the Philippines.
- 0900 UTC – PAGASA names the tropical depression as Auring.

January 6

- 1200 UTC - The JMA issues its final advisory on Tropical Depression Auring as it dissipates.
- 1800 UTC – PAGASA reports that Tropical Depression Auring has weakened into a tropical disturbance and issues the final advisory.

=== February ===
February 12

- 1000 UTC — PAGASA reports that Tropical Depression Bising has formed to the east of Mindanao in the Philippines.

February 13

- 0900 UTC — PAGASA reports that Tropical Depression Bising has weakened into a low-pressure area and issues the final advisory on the system.

=== March ===
- There were no tropical depressions reported in the North Western Pacific Ocean during March.

=== April ===
April 30

- 0300 UTC — PAGASA reports that Tropical Depression Crising has formed to the west of Mindoro in the Philippines.

=== May ===
May 1
0900 UTC — PAGASA reports that Tropical Depression Dante has formed about 80 km (50 mi) east of Legaspi City, Albay in the Philippines.
1200 UTC — The JMA designates Tropical Depression Dante as a Tropical Depression whilst reporting that another Tropical Depression has formed to the northwest of Guam.
2100 UTC — PAGASA issues its final warning on Tropical Depression Crising as it is downgraded to an area of low pressure.

May 2
0600 UTC — The JTWC designates Tropical Depression Dante as Tropical Depression 01W.
1200 UTC — The JTWC reports that Tropical Depression 01W has intensified into a Tropical Storm.
1800 UTC — The JMA reports that a Tropical Depression has formed to the east of Long Khánh in Vietnam.
1800 UTC — The JMA upgrades Tropical Depression Dante as Tropical Storm Kujira.

May 3
1200 UTC — The JMA designates the tropical depression previously located to the east of Long Khánh in Vietnam as Tropical Storm Chan-hom.
1200 UTC — The JMA upgrades Tropical Storm Kujira to a severe tropical storm.
1200 UTC — The JTWC designates Tropical Storm Chan-hom as Tropical Depression 02W.
1800 UTC — The JTWC upgrades Tropical Depression 02W to a Tropical Storm.

May 4
0000 UTC — The JMA upgrades Severe Tropical Storm Kujira to a typhoon.
0600 UTC — The JTWC upgrades Tropical Storm Kujira to a Category 1 typhoon.
1200 UTC — The JTWC reports that Typhoon Kujira has intensified into a Category 3 Typhoon.
1800 UTC — The JTWC reports that Typhoon Kujira has reached its 1 minute peak windspeeds of 215 km/h (135 mph) which makes it a Category 4 Typhoon.
1800 UTC — The JMA reports that Typhoon Kujira has reached its 10 minute peak windspeeds of 160 km/h (100 mph).
1800 UTC — The JMA upgrades Tropical Storm Chan-hom to a severe tropical storm.

May 5
0000 UTC — The JTWC reports that Typhoon Kujira has weakened into a Category 2 Typhoon.
0600 UTC — The JTWC reports that Typhoon Kujira has reintensified into a minimal Category 3 Typhoon.
1500 UTC — PAGASA issues its final advisory on Typhoon Dante (Kujira) as it moves out of their area of responsibility.
1800 UTC — The JTWC reports that Typhoon Kujira has weakened into a Category 1 Typhoon.

May 6
1500 UTC — Severe Tropical Storm Chan-hom enters the PAGASA's Area of Responsibility and is assigned the name Emong by PAGASA.
1800 UTC — The JMA upgrades Severe Tropical Storm Chan-hom to a typhoon as it reaches its -minute peak windspeeds of 120 km/h (75 mph).
1800 UTC — The JTWC upgrades Tropical Storm 02W to a Category 1 Typhoon.

May 7
0000 UTC — The JMA downgrades Typhoon Kujira to a Severe Tropical Storm.
0000 UTC — The JTWC issues its last advisory on Typhoon 01W (Kujira) as it becomes extratropical.
0600 UTC — JMA downgrades Severe Tropical Storm Kujira to a Tropical Storm.
0600 UTC — The JTWC reports that Typhoon Chan-hom has reached its 1 minute peak windspeeds of 155 km/h (95 mph) which makes it a Category 2 typhoon.
1200 UTC — The JTWC reports that Typhoon Chan-hom has weakened into a Category 1 Typhoon.
1200 UTC — The JMA downgrades Typhoon Chan-hom to a Severe Tropical Storm.
1500 UTC — PAGASA declares that Typhoon Chan-hom (Emong) has made landfall in Northern Pangasinan.
1800 UTC — The JMA downgrades Tropical Storm Kujira to an extratropical low.
1800 UTC — The JTWC reports that Typhoon Chan-hom has weakened into a Tropical Storm.

May 8
0600 UTC — The JMA downgrades Severe Tropical Storm Chan-hom to a Tropical Storm.

May 9
0000 UTC — The JMA downgrades Tropical Storm Chan-hom to a tropical depression.
0000 UTC — The JTWC issues its last advisory on Tropical Storm 02W (Chan-hom) as it has dissipated.
1500 UTC — PAGASA issues its last advisory on Tropical Depression Emong (Chan-hom) as it weakens into a low-pressure area.

May 10
0000 UTC — The JTWC reports that Chan-hom has regenerated into a Tropical Depression.

May 11
0600 UTC — The JTWC issues their final advisory on Chan-hom.

May 13
0600 UTC — The JMA reports that Tropical Depression Chan-hom has dissipated.
1200 UTC — The JMA reports that the remnants of Kujira have dissipated.

=== June ===
June 14
0600 UTC — The JMA reports that a Tropical Depression has formed to the east of the Philippines.
1800 UTC — The JMA downgrades the Tropical Depression to an area of low pressure.

June 16
0600 UTC — The JMA reports that the area of low pressure, which was previously located to the east of the Philippines, now located to the west of the Philippines, has regenerated into a Tropical Depression.
0600 UTC — The JTWC designates the Tropical Depression located to the west of the Philippines as Tropical Depression 03W.

June 17
1800 UTC — The JTWC reports that Tropical Depression 03W has intensified into a tropical storm.

June 18
0600 UTC — The JMA upgrades Tropical Depression 03W to Tropical Storm Linfa.

June 19
1200 UTC — The JMA upgrades Tropical Storm Linfa to a severe tropical storm.

June 20
0600 UTC — The JTWC reports that Tropical Storm 03W has intensified into a category one typhoon.
0900 UTC — The JMA reports that Severe Tropical Storm Linfa has reached its 10-minute peak winds of 110 km/h (70 mph).
1200 UTC — The JTWC reports that Typhoon 03W has reached its peak winds of 140 km/h (85 mph).

June 21
0600 UTC — The JTWC downgrades Typhoon Linfa to a tropical storm.
1230 UTC — Severe Tropical Storm Linfa makes landfall on the Chinese province of Fujian.
1500 UTC — The JMA downgrades Severe Tropical Storm Linfa to a tropical storm.

June 22
0000 UTC — The JTWC downgrades Tropical Storm 03W to a tropical depression.
0600 UTC — The JMA downgrades Tropical Storm Linfa to a tropical depression.
1200 UTC — The JMA reports that a Tropical depression has formed about 960 km/h (600 miles) to the southeast of Manila, in the Philippines.
1200 UTC — The JTWC issues its final advisory on Tropical Depression 03W. They also report that Tropical Depression 04W has formed about 960 km/h (600 miles) to the southeast of the Philippines.
2100 UTC — PAGASA designates Tropical Depression 04W as Tropical Depression Feria.

June 23
0000 UTC — The JMA issues its last advisory on Tropical Depression Linfa.
0000 UTC — The JTWC upgrades Tropical Depression 04W to a tropical storm.
0600 UTC — The JMA upgrades the tropical depression to a tropical storm and names it as Nangka.
0900 UTC — PAGASA reports that Tropical Storm Feria (Nangka) has made landfall on Borongan, Eastern Samar.
1500 UTC — PAGASA reports that Tropical Storm Feria (Nangka) has made landfall on Masbate island.

June 24
0430 UTC — PAGASA reports that Tropical Storm Feria (Nangka) has made landfall in Calapan City, on Mindoro.

June 25
1800 UTC — PAGASA reports that Tropical Storm Feria {Nangka} has moved out of their area of responsibility.

June 26
1200 UTC — The JTWC downgrades Tropical Storm 04W (Nangka) to a tropical depression.
1800 UTC — The JMA downgrades Tropical Storm Nangka to a tropical depression as it makes landfall on the Chinese province of Guangdong.
1800 UTC — The JTWC issues its final advisory on Tropical Depression Nangka.

June 27
0000 UTC — The JMA issues its last advisory on Tropical Depression Nangka.

=== July ===
July 9
0900 UTC — PAGASA reports that Tropical Depression Gorio has formed 340 km (210 mi) to the east of Aparri, Cagayan, in the Philippines.

=== August ===
August 2
The JMA reports that a tropical depression that later became Typhoon Morakot has formed in the Philippine Sea.

=== September ===
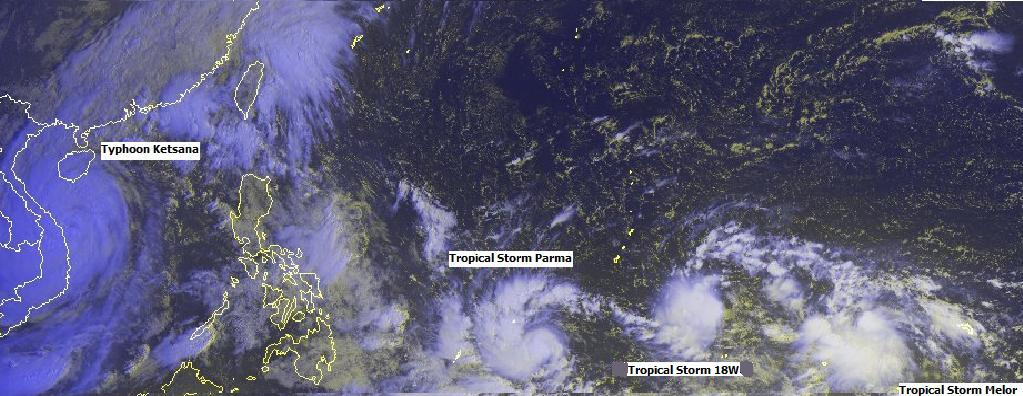
4 systems in the West North Pacific on September 30.

Typhoon Ondoy (Ketsana) reached landfall bringing severe floods killing up to 300 people in Metro Manila.

=== November ===
November 21
0600 UTC — The JMA reports that a tropical depression has formed.
1800 UTC — The JMA reports that a tropical depression has formed about 880 km, (545 mi) to the southeast of Guam.

November 22
0000 UTC — The JTWC designates the depression previously located about 880 km, (545 mi) to the southeast of Guam as Tropical Depression 26W.

=== December ===
December 3

- 1800 UTC — The JMA reports that a Tropical Depression has formed about 640 km (400 mi) to the northwest of Hagåtña, Guam.

December 4

- 0000 UTC — The JTWC designates the Tropical Depression as Tropical Depression 28W.

December 5

- 0000 UTC — The JTWC reports that Tropical Depression 28W, has intensified into a tropical storm.
- 1200 UTC — The JTWC reports that Tropical Storm 28W has weakened into an extratropical storm.

December 6

- 0600 UTC — The JMA issues its final advisory on Tropical Depression 28W.

December 8

- 0000 UTC — The JMA reports that a Tropical Depression has formed about 965 km (600 mi) to the southeast of Manila, Philippines.
- 1800 UTC — The JMA issues its final advisory on the Tropical Depression.

December 31

- 2359 UTC - The 2009 Pacific typhoon season officially ends as the 2010 Pacific typhoon season officially starts.

== See also ==
- List of Pacific typhoon seasons
- 2009 Pacific hurricane season
- 2009 Atlantic hurricane season
- 2009 North Indian Ocean cyclone season
- South-West Indian Ocean cyclone seasons: 2008–09, 2009–10
- Australian region cyclone seasons: 2008–09, 2009–10
- South Pacific cyclone seasons: 2008–09, 2009–10
