= Tropical Storm Soudelor (2009) =

Pacific tropical storm in 2009

Tropical Storm Soudelor (Gorio)
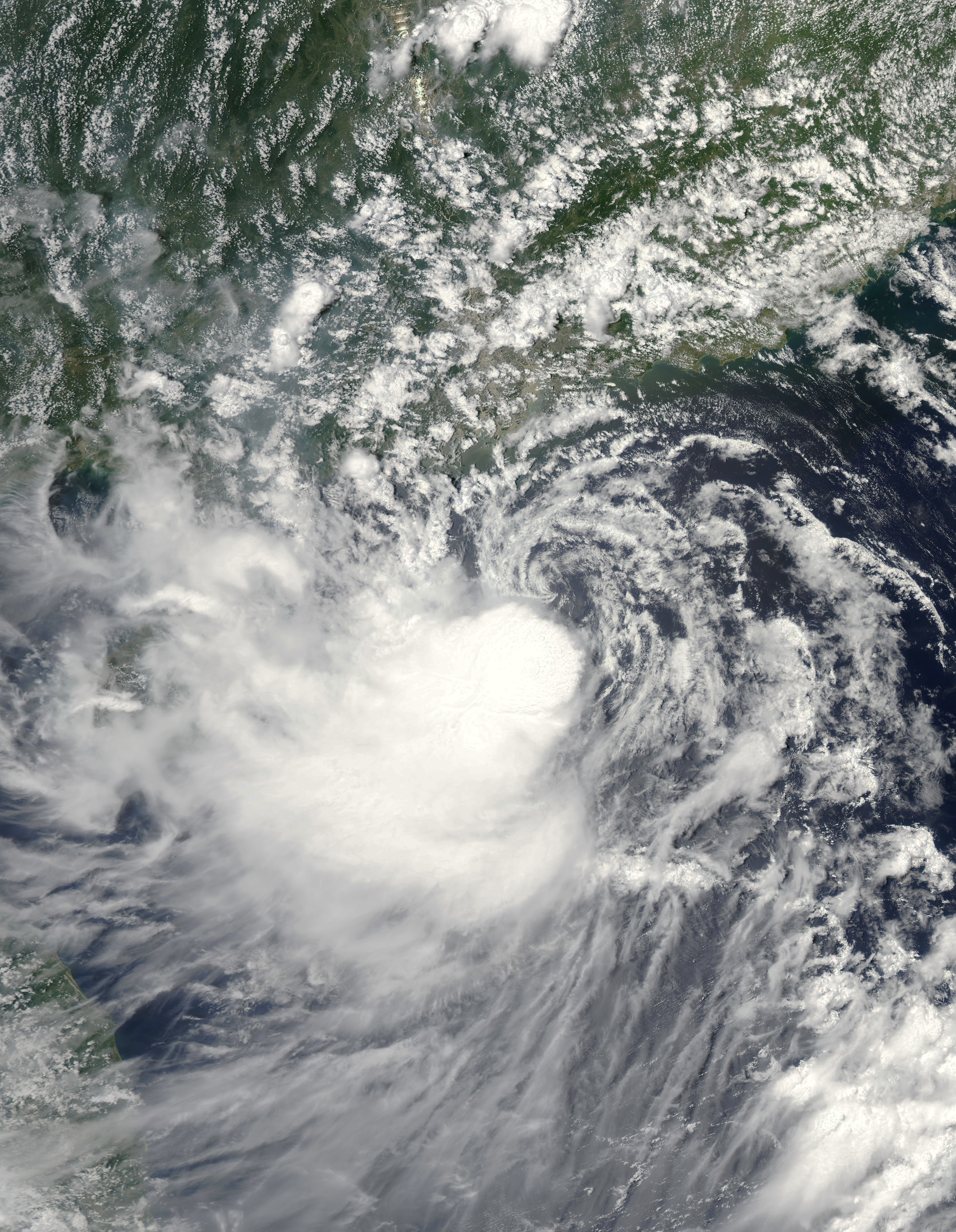
- Tropical Storm Soudelor at peak intensity on July 11

Meteorological history
- Formed: July 9, 2009
- Dissipated: July 13, 2009

Tropical storm
- 10-minute sustained (JMA)
- Highest winds: 65 km/h (40 mph)
- Lowest pressure: 992 hPa (mbar); 29.29 inHg

Tropical storm
- 1-minute sustained (SSHWS/JTWC)
- Highest winds: 65 km/h (40 mph)
- Lowest pressure: 996 hPa (mbar); 29.41 inHg

Overall effects
- Fatalities: 17 direct, 2 indirect
- Damage: $6.58 million (2009 USD)
- Areas affected: Philippines, China, Vietnam
- IBTrACS
- Part of the 2009 Pacific typhoon season

Tropical Storm Soudelor, (Note: The name Soudelor (Pohnpeian: Sau Deleur, [sʲɐuteleur]) was contributed by the Federated States of Micronesia and refers to legendary Pohnpeian chiefs during the Saudeleur Dynasty in Pohnpeian.) known in the Philippines as Tropical Depression Gorio, was a weak tropical cyclone that led to deadly flooding in the Philippines, China and Vietnam in mid July 2009. Forming out of an area of low pressure on July 9, Soudelor failed to maintain deep convection around its center for the duration of its existence. On July 10, the depression brushed the northern Philippines and intensified into a tropical storm on July 11. Later that day, the storm crossed the Leizhou Peninsula. The last public advisory from the JMA was issued the following day after Soudelor made landfall in Quảng Ninh, Vietnam.

In the Philippines, tropical storm Soudelor produced severe flooding that killed one person and resulted in the issuance of a state of calamity. The storm later killed 15 people in southern China after a group of hikers were washed away in a flash flood on Hainan Island. In Vietnam, rainfall up to 250 mm (9.8 in) caused widespread flooding, and lightning triggered by the storm killed two people in the country.

== Meteorological history ==
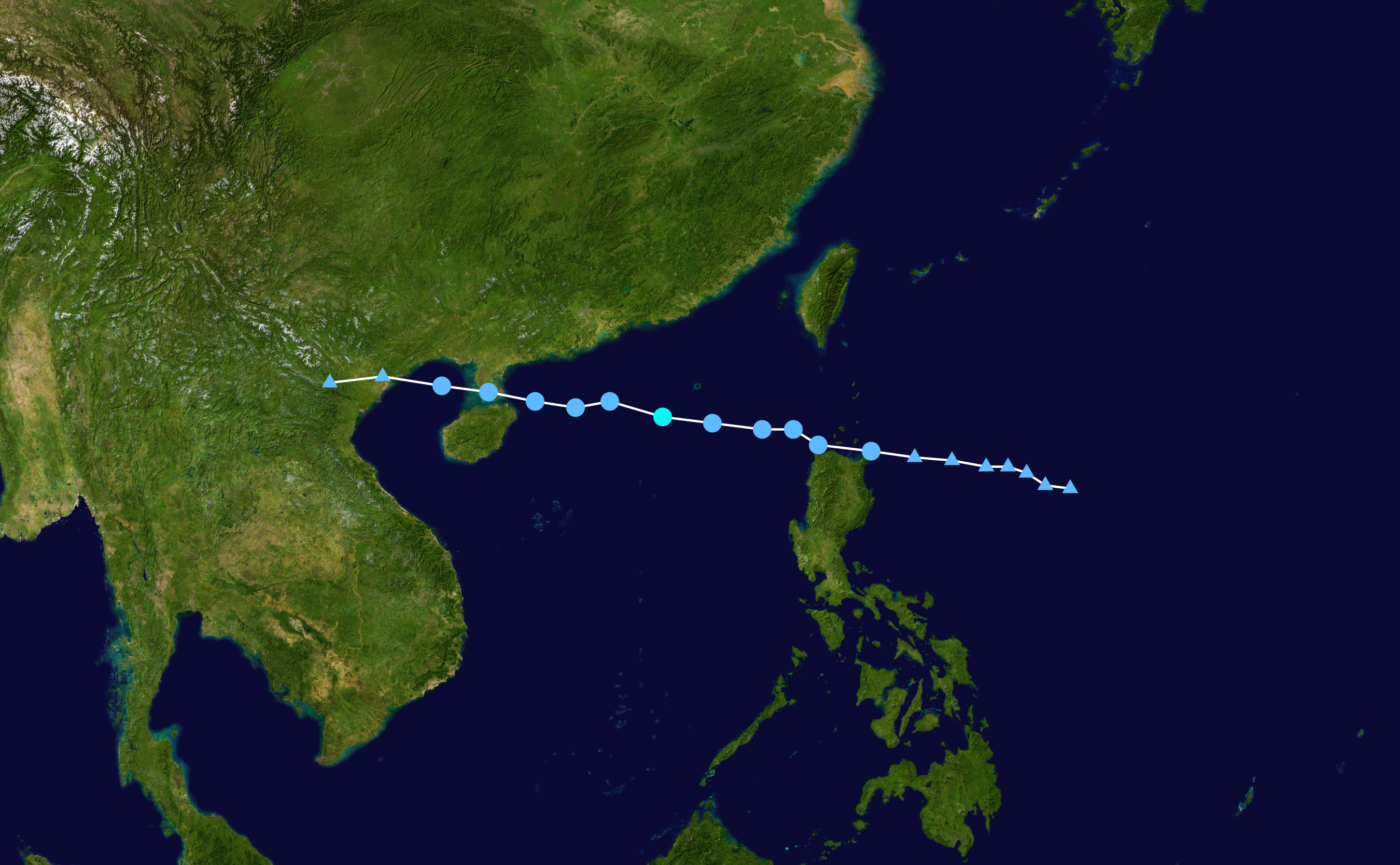
Map plotting the storm's track and intensity, according to the Saffir–Simpson scale Map key Saffir–Simpson scale Tropical depression (≤38 mph, ≤62 km/h) Tropical storm (39–73 mph, 63–118 km/h) Category 1 (74–95 mph, 119–153 km/h) Category 2 (96–110 mph, 154–177 km/h) Category 3 (111–129 mph, 178–208 km/h) Category 4 (130–156 mph, 209–251 km/h) Category 5 (≥157 mph, ≥252 km/h) Unknown Storm type Tropical cyclone Subtropical cyclone Extratropical cyclone, remnant low, tropical disturbance, or monsoon depression

Late on 7 July 2009, the Joint Typhoon Warning Center (JTWC) reported that an area of disturbed weather had formed 900 km (560 mi) to the northwest of Yap. Deep convection was embedded in a broad, weak, poorly defined circulation that was starting to be enhanced by a tropical upper tropospheric trough to the east of the system. Over the next couple of days, gradual development took place and early on July 9, a Tropical Cyclone Formation Alert was issued by the JTWC. Around the same time, the Philippine Atmospheric, Geophysical and Astronomical Services Administration (PAGASA) designated the system as a tropical depression, giving it the name Gorio. Later that day both the JMA and the JTWC reported that the depression had formed and started to issue warnings on the depression, with the JTWC designating it as 05W;

On July 10, PAGASA issued their final advisory on Tropical Depression Gorio as it moved out of their area of responsibility. Hampered by an unfavorable upper-level environment, the depression barely intensified into a tropical storm early on July 11. Upon becoming a tropical storm, the JMA named the system Soudelor reporting peak winds of 65 km/h, (40 mph). Later that day the JTWC reported that Soudelor had weakened into a depression; however they re-upgraded it to a tropical storm as it moved closer to Hainan Province. Shortly before landfall in Leizhou Peninsula, China, the JTWC downgraded the storm to a tropical depression. After moving back over water in the Gulf of Tonkin, the JTWC issued their final advisory on the depression. The JMA, however, continued to monitor Soudelor until it made landfall near Bãi Cháy in Quảng Ninh Province in Vietnam several hours later.

== Preparations and impact ==
=== Philippines ===
The Philippine Atmospheric, Geophysical and Astronomical Services Administration issued public storm signal one for nine regions of the northern Philippines. As a tropical depression, Soudelor brushed northern Luzon in the Philippines, producing upwards of 330 mm (13 in) of rainfall which resulted in flash flooding and landslides. In Ilocos Norte, major roadways were completely blocked by high waters. The storm affected 19,845 people throughout the Philippines and one person was killed after being swept away by a fast current. At least ten villages were flooded during the storm. Three homes were destroyed and two more were damaged by Soudelor. A total of 42 barangays were flooded by the storm, killing 21 cows and isolating low-lying areas. On July 10, a battalion from the army engineers were deployed to the affected region to repair infrastructure. Following the storm, the hardest hit town Bacarra, Ilocos Norte, was put under a state of calamity and regional aid was deployed to the area. Total damage was estimated at PHP 205 million $4.4 (US 2009).

=== China ===
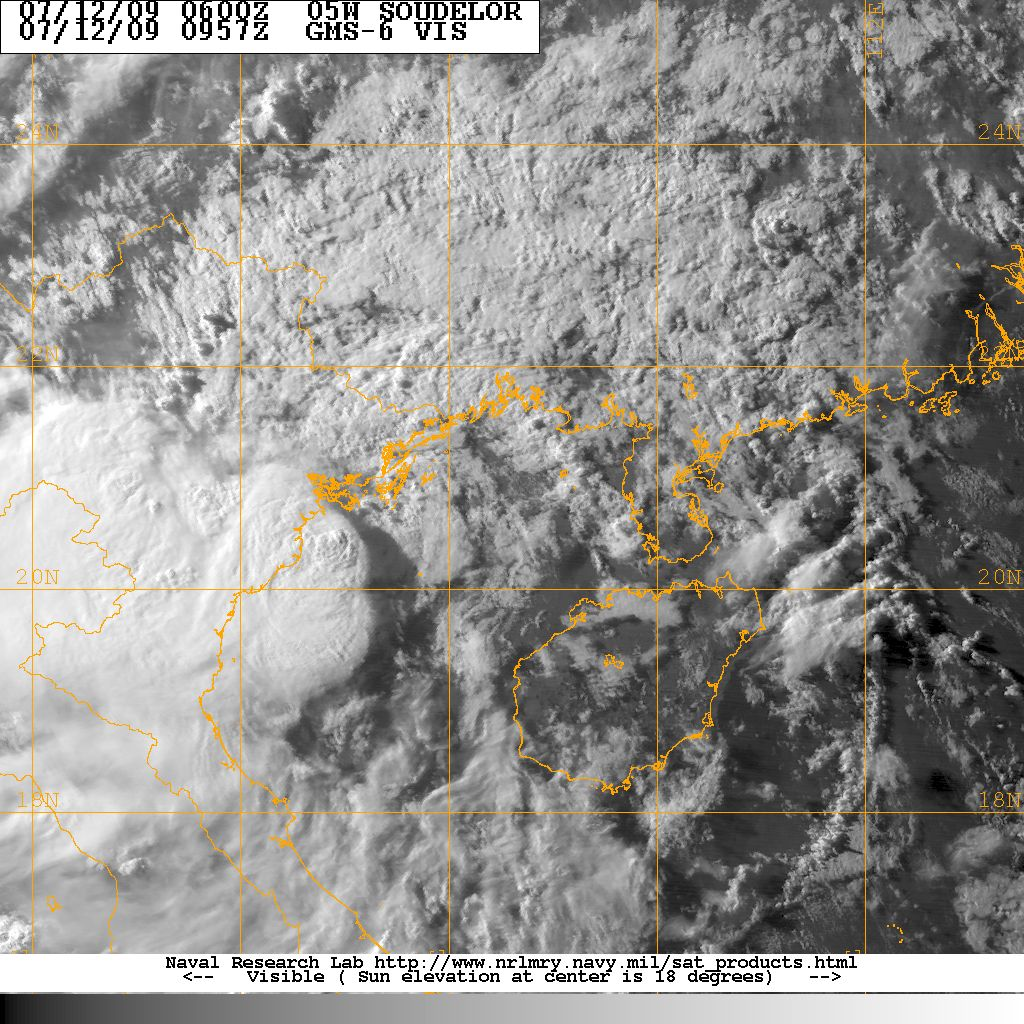
Tropical Depression Soudelor making landfall in Vietnam on July 12

In Hong Kong, the Hong Kong Observatory issued standby signal No. 1 as Soudelor neared the region on July 11. The following day, the signal was raised to strong wind No. 3 due to the possibility of landfall near the region. The signal was lowered back to No. 1 later that day before they were all canceled early on July 12. The emergency response system was put at level four water-disaster in preparation for torrential rainfall from Soudelor. A red alert was also declared for the affected regions. Torrential rains in Hainan caused significant flooding that killed 15 hikers and left several others missing. Numerous roads were also cut off or destroyed by landslides and 30 villages were inundated with flood waters. In Hong Kong, outer bands of Soudelor produced squally rain showers on July 11. About 20 trees reportedly fell within Hong Kong, one of which struck a mini bus terminal. The direct economic loss to china was estimated at about RMB 1.71billion, ($5.4 million 2009 USD).

=== Vietnam ===
Ahead of the storm, 4,000 fishing vessels were ordered to return to port and up to 200 volunteers were mobilized to deal with damages from the storm. Officials evacuated people from 297 residences to higher grounds and reported that 977 other homes were in threatened areas. Roughly VND20.1 billion (US$1.18 million) was total damage by Soudelor. An estimated 5,000 sandbags and 1,000 cubic meters of canvas were distributed to flood-prone areas. The remnants of Soudelor produced widespread torrential rains in Northern Vietnam on July 13. Rainfall totals peaked at 250 mm (9.8 in) in the region. Heavy rainfall, amounting to 130 mm (5.1 in), was also recorded in Hanoi. The capital city experienced flash flooding, inundating numerous streets and buildings. Two men were killed by lightning strikes associated with the storm. Officials reported that at least 13 large trees had been downed by high winds. Flood waters in the hardest-hit areas reached a depth of 0.35 m (1.1 ft). One person was killed after being swept away. A tornado also touched down during the storm, destroying the roofs of three homes. Thousands of hectares of croplands were inundated by flood waters. Following the storm, 1,000 tonnes of rice was allocated for victims of the floods.

== See also ==
- Timeline of the 2009 Pacific typhoon season
- Typhoon Molave (2009)
- Typhoon Kai-tak (2012)
- Tropical Storm Dianmu (2016)
