= Long Khánh =

Long Khánh may refer to:

== Places in Vietnam ==
- Long Khánh, Đồng Tháp: commune in Đồng Tháp province
- Long Khánh, Đồng Nai: ward in Đồng Nai municipality
- Long Khánh (city): provincial city in the former Đồng Nai province
- Long Khánh: commune in Cai Lậy district-level town, Tiền Giang province (today part of Cai Lậy ward, Đồng Tháp province).
- Long Khánh: commune in Bến Cầu district, Tây Ninh province (today part of Long Thuận commune, Tây Ninh province).
- Long Khánh: commune in Bảo Yên district, Lào Cai province (today part of Phúc Khánh commune, Lào Cai province).
- Long Khánh: commune in Duyên Hải district, Trà Vinh province (today part of Long Thành commune, Vĩnh Long province).
- Long Khánh A, Long Khánh B: commune in Hồng Ngự district, Đồng Tháp province (today part of Long Khánh commune, Đồng Tháp province).
- Long Khánh province, province of South Vietnam

== The king's reign name ==
- Long Khánh era of Trần Duệ Tông emperor of Đại Việt (Vietnam).
- Long Khánh (Longqing) era of Longqing Emperor of Ming dynasty (China).
