= Tropical Depression 18W (2009) =

Pacific tropical depression in 2009

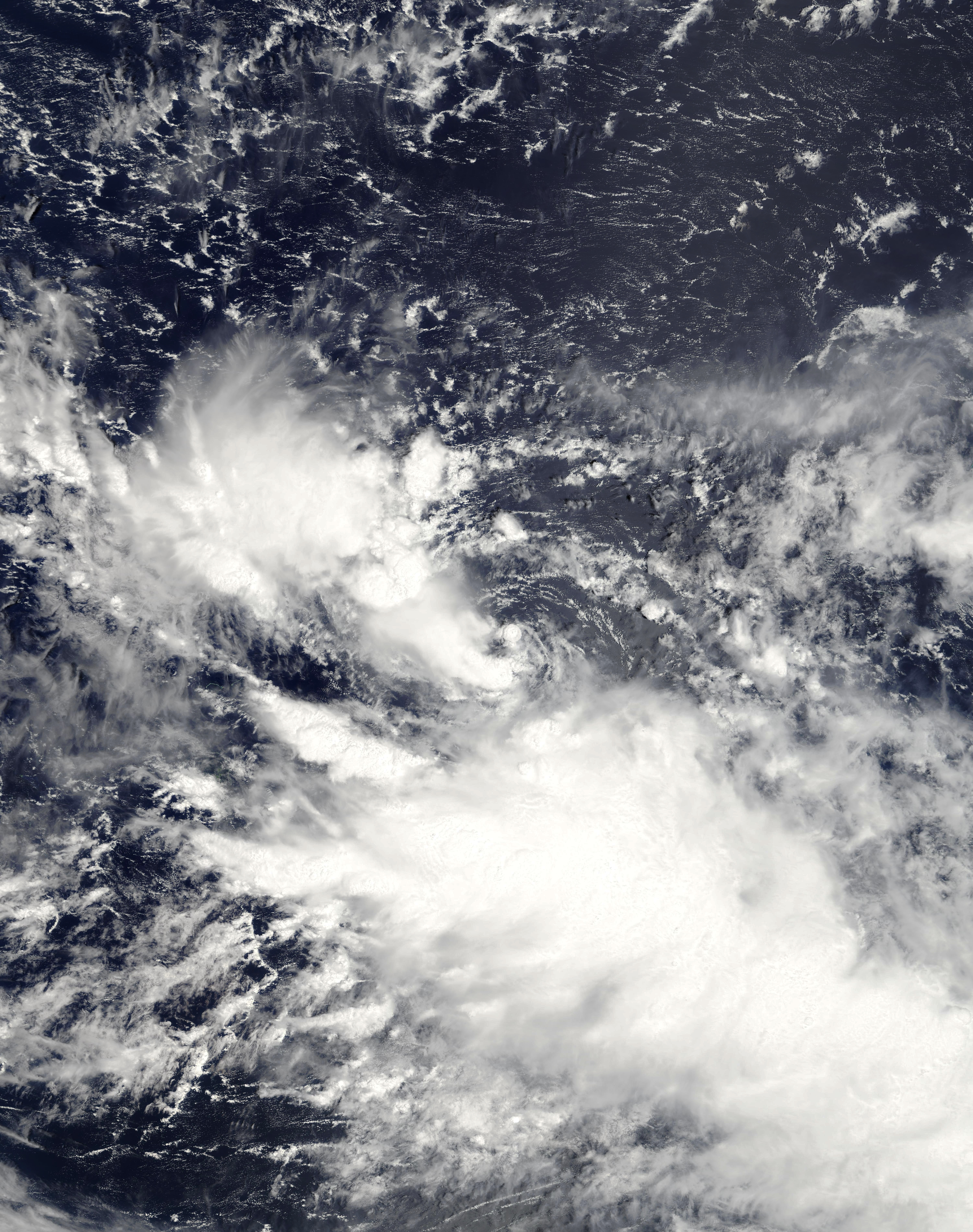
- Tropical Depression 18W at peak intensity on September 28

Meteorological history
- Formed: September 26, 2009
- Dissipated: September 30, 2009

Tropical depression
- 10-minute sustained (JMA)
- Highest winds: 55 km/h (35 mph)
- Lowest pressure: 1000 hPa (mbar); 29.53 inHg

Tropical depression
- 1-minute sustained (SSHWS/JTWC)
- Highest winds: 55 km/h (35 mph)
- Lowest pressure: 999 hPa (mbar); 29.50 inHg

Overall effects
- Fatalities: None reported
- Damage: Minimal
- Areas affected: Mariana Islands and Guam
- IBTrACS
- Part of the 2009 Pacific typhoon season

Tropical Depression 18W was a weak, short-lived tropical cyclone that brought heavy rains to parts of the Mariana Islands ahead of the more intense Typhoon Melor. Forming from an area of low pressure on September 26, 18W was first monitored by the Japan Meteorological Agency (JMA) as a tropical depression. Tracking generally towards the west, deep convection gradually developed around the system and the Joint Typhoon Warning Center (JTWC) issued their first advisory on the depression early on September 28. Although the depression initially struggled to maintain deep convection, it eventually became better organized and was upgraded to a tropical storm on September 29 by the JTWC. Several hours after reaching this intensity, the system began to rapidly dissipate as its inflow and outflow were severely disrupted by two nearby storms, Parma to the west and Melor to the east. The cyclone fully dissipated near Guam early on September 30 before being absorbed by Typhoon Parma.

Ahead of the system's arrival in Guam, tropical storm watches and warnings were issued by the National Weather Service. On September 29, a state of emergency was declared by Governor Felix P. Camacho and relief funds were allocated in case of damage after the storm. Due to the low-intensity of the storm, it had little impact on Guam. Only increased winds and moderate rainfall were reported.

== Meteorological history ==
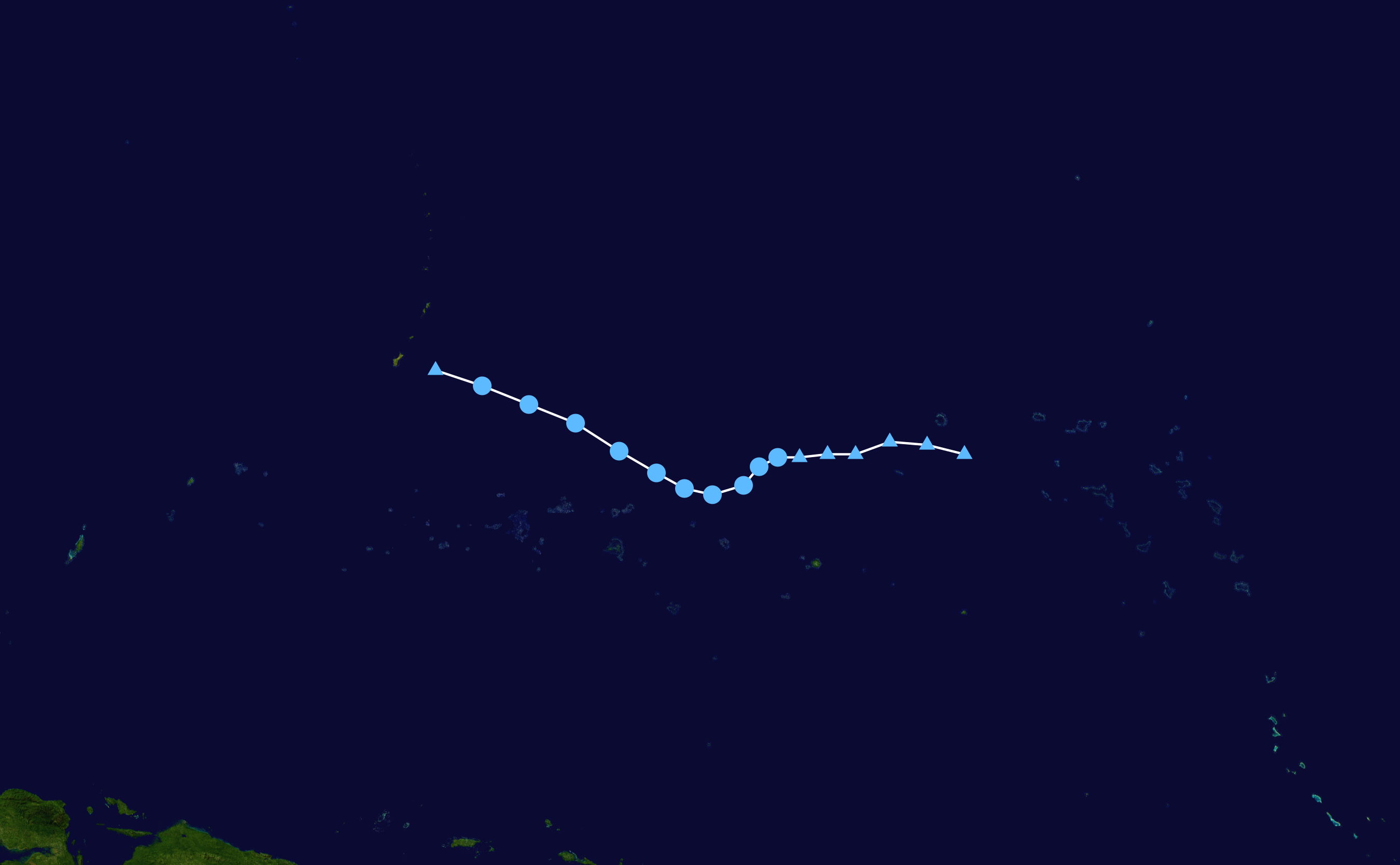
Map plotting the storm's track and intensity, according to the Saffir–Simpson scale Map key Saffir–Simpson scale Tropical depression (≤38 mph, ≤62 km/h) Tropical storm (39–73 mph, 63–118 km/h) Category 1 (74–95 mph, 119–153 km/h) Category 2 (96–110 mph, 154–177 km/h) Category 3 (111–129 mph, 178–208 km/h) Category 4 (130–156 mph, 209–251 km/h) Category 5 (≥157 mph, ≥252 km/h) Unknown Storm type Tropical cyclone Subtropical cyclone Extratropical cyclone, remnant low, tropical disturbance, or monsoon depression

The storm originated from an area of low pressure on September 24 that formed roughly 725 km (450 mi) east-northeast of Pohnpei. Deep convection had developed in association with the low and was beginning to wrap around the center of circulation. By September 26, the system had developed strong outflow and was intensifying. Later that day, the Japan Meteorological Agency (JMA) began monitoring the low as a tropical depression. The following day, the Joint Typhoon Warning Center (JTWC) issued their first advisory on the depression. At this time, it was being steered towards the west in response to a mid-level ridge to the north. Little intensification took place as convection barely deepened around the low-level circulation; however, the JTWC anticipated the system to intensify into a tropical storm within 24 hours.

Although conditions for intensification were present, convection associated with the depression weakened significantly by September 28. Forecasts for the system became increasingly complicated due to the formation of Tropical Depression Nineteen-W to the east-south-east. Later that day, the motion of the storm shifted to the west-northwest in response to a subtropical ridge north of the depression. The center of circulation had become nearly devoid of convection late on September 28, with only the western portion of the system featuring shower and thunderstorm activity. By the morning of September 29, convection redeveloped around the center of 18W and the JTWC determined that the system had intensified into a tropical storm, with winds peaking at 65 km/h (40 mph 1-minute sustained). However, in post storm analysis, the JTWC determined that the depression had not intensified into a tropical storm and lowered the peak wind-speeds to 55 km/h (35 mph).

Around the time the system was upgraded to a tropical storm by the JTWC, the JMA assessed it to have reached its peak intensity as a strong tropical depression with winds of 55 km/h (35 mph 10-minute sustained) and a barometric pressure of 999 mbar (hPa). Struggling to maintain deep convection, the system's inflow and outflow patterns became severely disrupted by two intensifying cyclones, Parma to the west and Melor to the west. The combined effects of the two other storms eventually left the center of 18W devoid of convection as it approached Guam. As it passed near the island, the storm rapidly dissipated, first weakening to a depression and then losing its low-level circulation. It was no longer considered a tropical cyclone a few hours after brushing Guam. This coincided with the issuance of the final warnings from the JTWC and the JMA.

== Preparations and impact ==
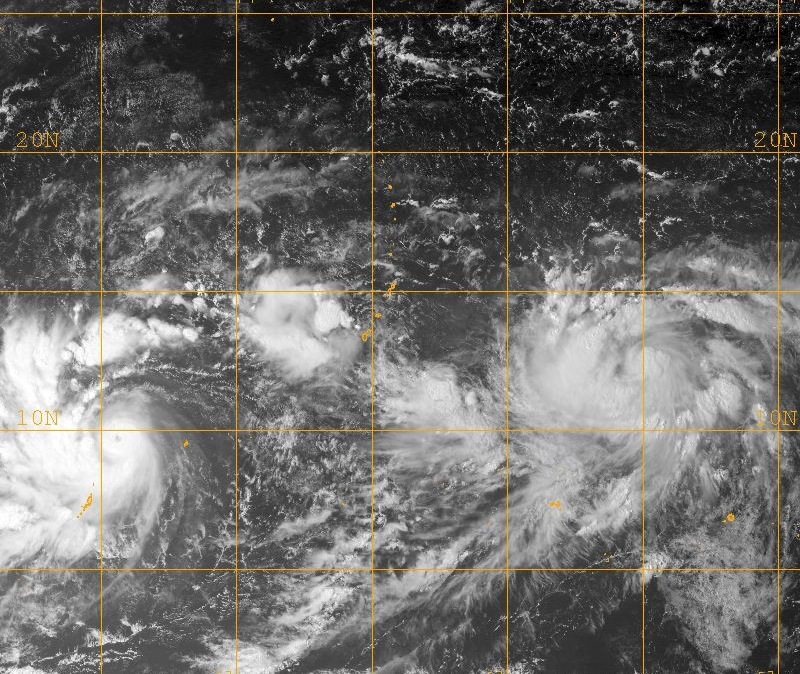
Typhoon Parma (left), Tropical Depression 18W (center) and Tropical Storm Melor (right) on September 30

Several hours after being classified a tropical depression on September 29, the National Weather Service issued a tropical storm watch for the islands of Guam and Rota. Later that day, the watches were upgraded to warnings as 18W intensified into a tropical storm. The same day, the emergency operations center on Guam was fully activated. Public schools on the island were closed by officials until further notice. Although warnings were issued for the Mariana Islands, most residents did not heed warnings. Stores selling supplies such as plywood, lumber, nails, screws, batteries and butane stoves reported only a slight increase in sales. There were also no sales of flashlights and generators ahead of the system. Although most did not prepare fully, one resident told news reporters "We haven't been hit in a while so...I'm going to prepare." Twelve shelters were opened across the island; however, they did not have supplies and people were advised to bring at least three days worth of food and water.

Weather radar loop of Tropical Depression 18W's rainbands passing Guam shortly before dissipating

Just prior to the arrival of the storm, Governor Felix P. Camacho declared a state of emergency for the island of Guam and allocated $250,000 in funds for relief efforts. A tropical cyclone condition of readiness (TCCOR), a warning scale used by the military on the island, was placed at level one, the highest on the scale. Rota was also placed under a TCCOR at level 3. By the afternoon of September 29, roughly 250 residents had sought refuge in shelters across the island. All flights to and from Guam were canceled and the Team Anderson Air Show was rescheduled. Five ships and a submarine from the United States Navy moved out to sea to avoid the storm; however, one submarine was unable to leave and remained at port during the storm. A total of 100 people from the Red Cross disaster team were deployed in Guam to prepare for any damage caused by the storm.

During the storm, the National Weather Service issued an urban and small stream flood advisory due to the likelihood of heavy rains. Late on September 29 through the morning of September 30, 18W brought high winds and heavy rains to Guam and nearby Rota as it tracked between the two islands. Shortly after the storm passed by, the Governor Felix Camacho issued a press statement lowering the TCCOR to level 4. All tropical storm warnings were also canceled at this time. With this, shelters began to scale down operations and were set to close at 5:00 pm local time on September 30.

== See also ==
- 2009 Pacific typhoon season
- Timeline of the 2009 Pacific typhoon season
- Typhoon Parma (2009)
