= Timeline of the 2009 Pacific hurricane season =

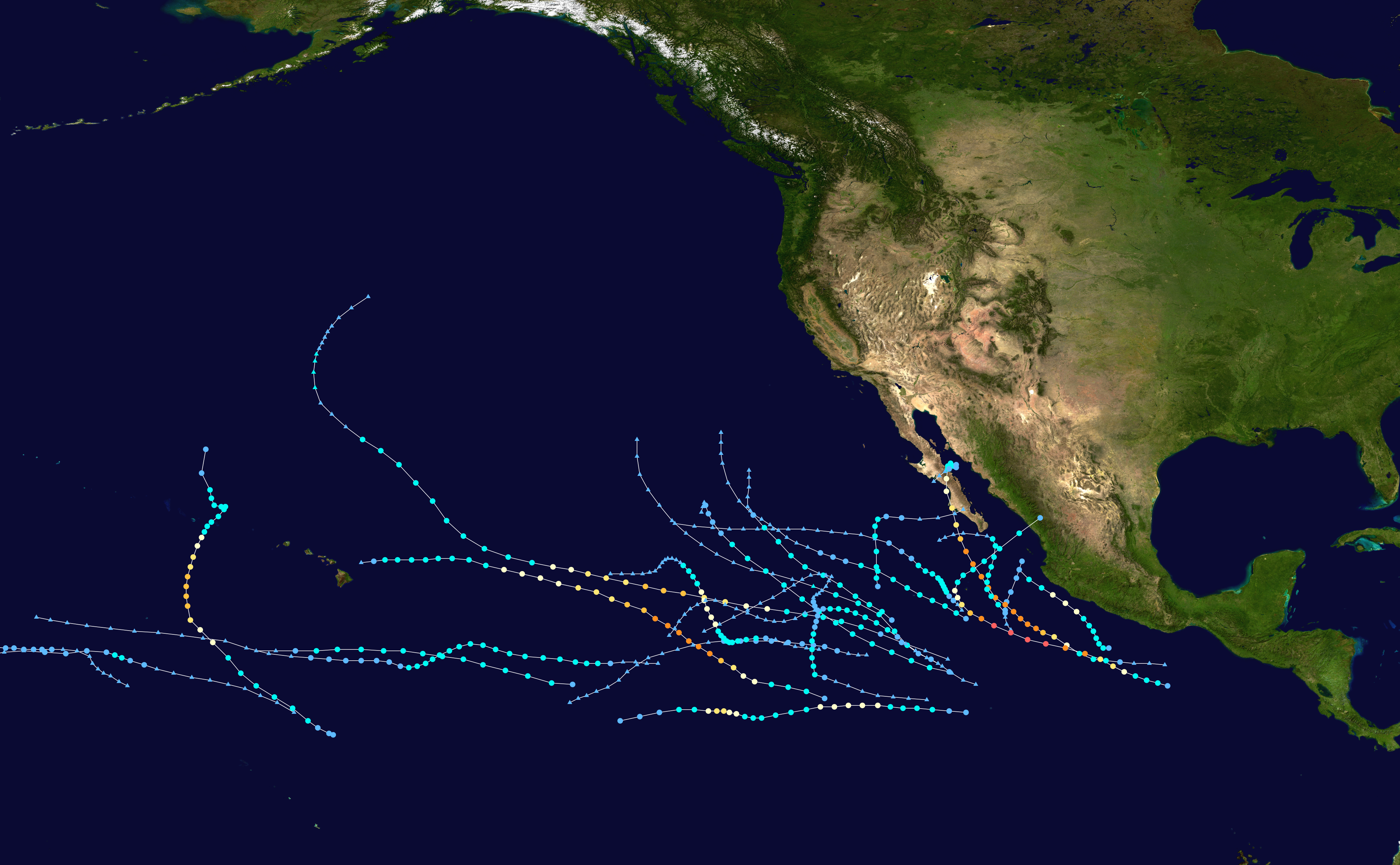
- Season summary map

Season boundaries
- First system formed: June 18, 2009
- Last system dissipated: October 27, 2009

Strongest system
- Name: Rick
- Maximum winds: 180 mph (285 km/h) (1-minute sustained)
- Lowest pressure: 906 mbar (hPa; 26.75 inHg)

Longest lasting system
- Name: Neki
- Duration: 8.25 days
Storm articles
- Tropical Depression One-E (2009)
- Hurricane Andres (2009)
- Hurricane Felicia (2009)
- Hurricane Jimena (2009)
- Tropical Storm Patricia (2009)
- Hurricane Rick (2009)
- Hurricane Neki

The 2009 Pacific hurricane season officially started on May 15 in the East Pacific Ocean, and on June 1 in the Central Pacific; they both ended on November 30. These dates conventionally delimit the period of each year when most tropical cyclones form in the Pacific basin. No tropical cyclones formed during the month of May, making 2009 the first time that no tropical cyclones formed during May since 1999. The first tropical cyclone of the year, Tropical Depression One-E, formed June 18, and dissipated the following day. The first named storm of the season, Hurricane Andres formed on June 21. The final storm of the season, Neki, dissipaed on October 27.

This timeline documents tropical cyclone formations, strengthening, weakening, landfalls, extratropical transitions, and dissipations during the season. It includes information that was not released throughout the season, meaning that data from post-storm reviews by the National Hurricane Center and the Central Pacific Hurricane Center, such as a storm that was not initially warned upon, has been included.

The time stamp for each event is first stated using Coordinated Universal Time (UTC), the 24-hour clock where 0000 = midnight UTC. The NHC uses both UTC and the time zone where the center of the tropical cyclone is currently located. Prior to 2015, two time zones were utilized in the Eastern Pacific basin: Pacific east of 140°W, and Hawaii−Aleutian from 140°W to the International Date Line. In this timeline, the respective area time is included in parentheses. Additionally, figures for maximum sustained winds and position estimates are rounded to the nearest 5 units (miles, or kilometers), following National Hurricane Center practice. Direct wind observations are rounded to the nearest whole number. Atmospheric pressures are listed to the nearest millibar and nearest hundredth of an inch of mercury.

== Timeline of events ==
=== May ===
May 15

- The 2009 Eastern Pacific hurricane season officially begins.

=== June ===
June 1

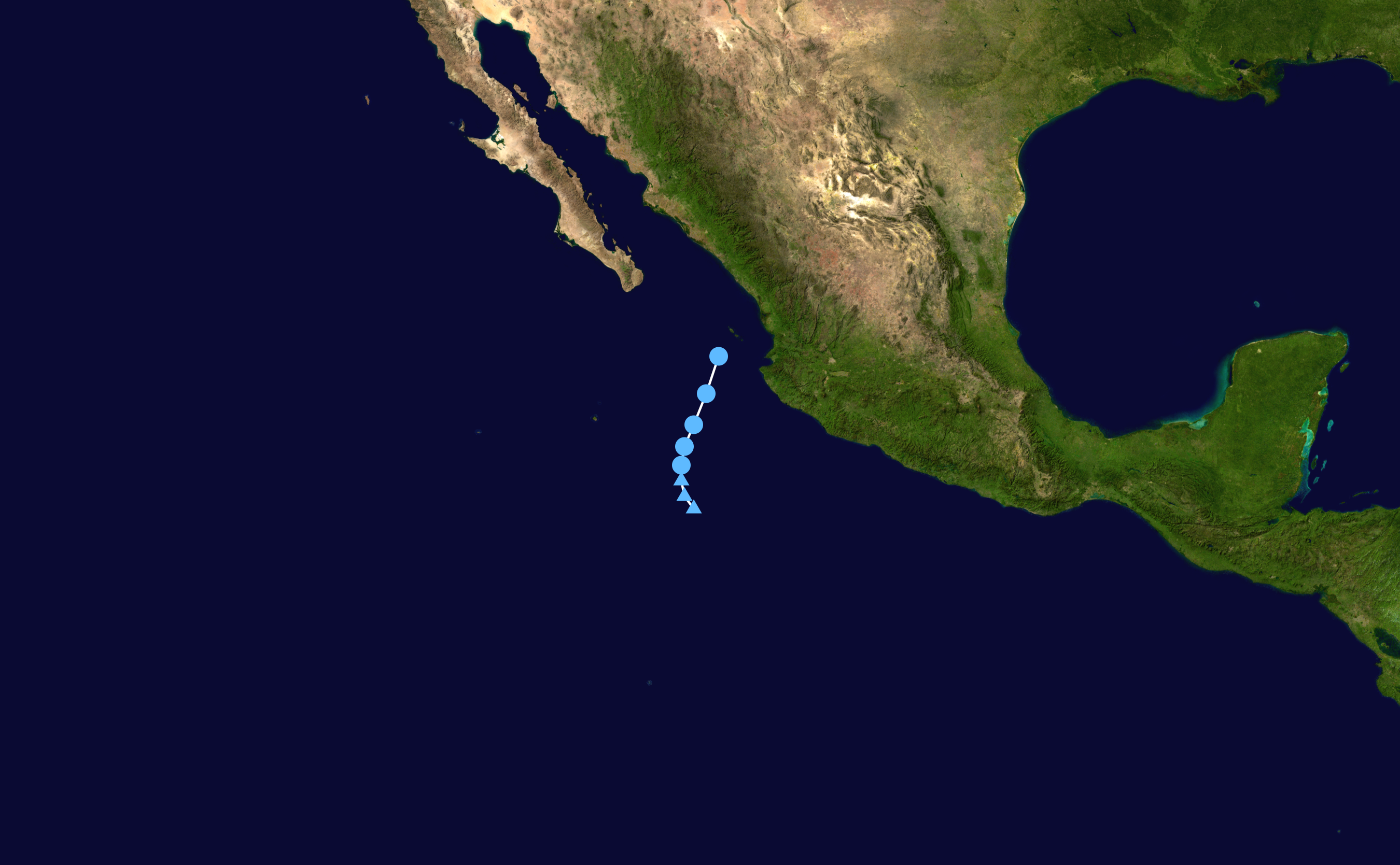
Track map of Tropical Depression One-E

- The 2009 Central Pacific hurricane season officially begins.

June 18

- 1200 UTC (5:00 pm PDT) – Tropical Depression One-E forms about 405 mi (650 km) south-southwest of Mazatlán, Sinaloa.

June 19

- 0000 UTC (5:00 pm PDT June 18) – Tropical Depression One-E attains its peak intensity of 35 mph (55 km/h) and a barometric pressure of 1003 mbar (hPa; 29.62 inHg).
- 1800 UTC (11:00 pm PDT) – Tropical Depression One-E degenerates into a trough of low pressure near the Mexican coastline.

June 21

- 1200 UTC (11:00 am PDT) – Tropical Depression Two-E forms about 165 mi (265 km) southeast of Acapulco, Mexico.
- 1800 UTC (5:00 pm PDT) – Tropical Depression Two-E strengthens into Tropical Storm Andres.

June 23

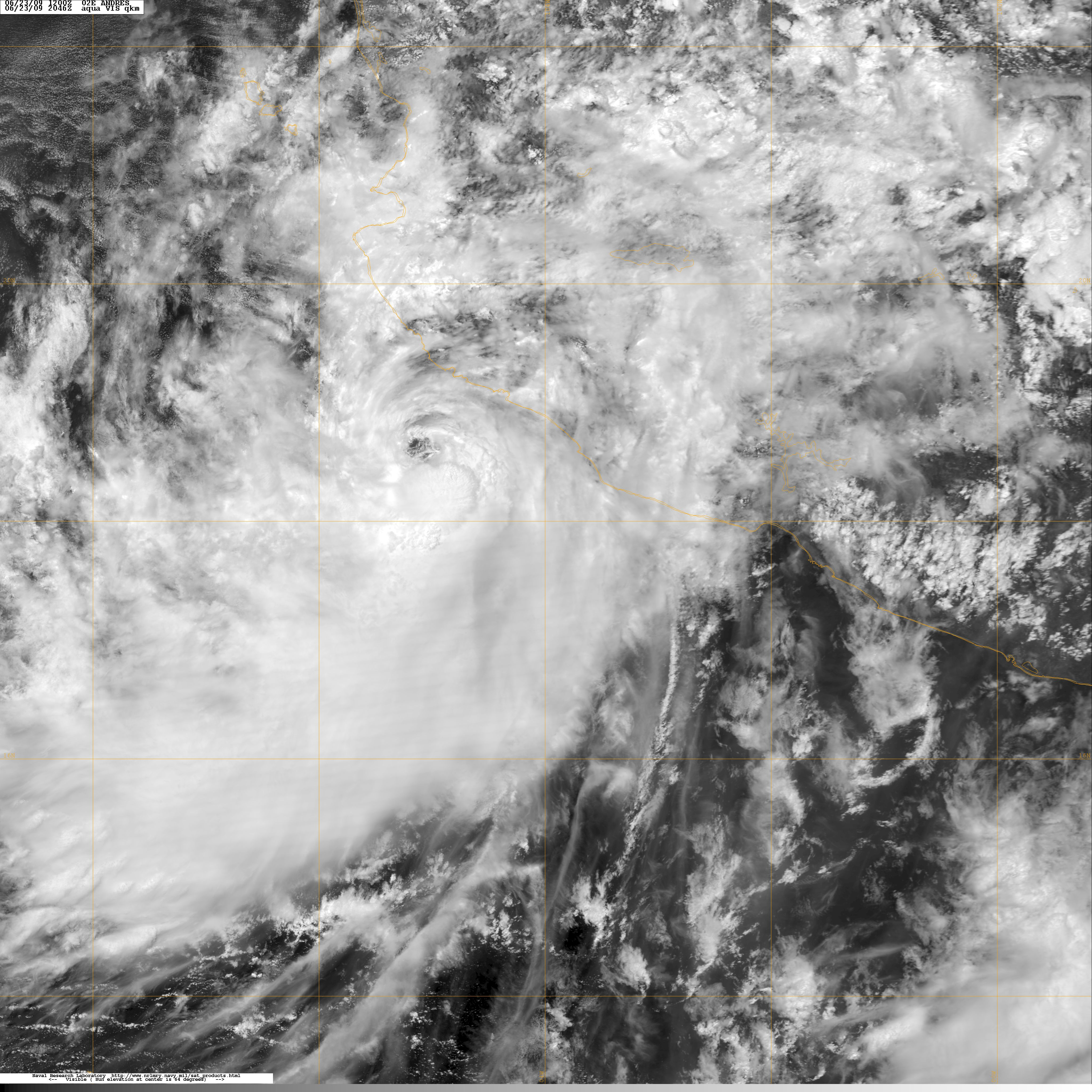
Hurricane Andres at peak intensity

- 0600 UTC (5:00 am PDT) – Tropical Storm Andres intensifies into a Category 1 hurricane, with winds peaking at 80 mph (130 km/h), the first of the season while located 80 mi (130 km) southwest of Lázaro Cárdenas, Mexico.

June 24

- 0000 UTC (5:00 am PDT) – Hurricane Andres weakens to a tropical storm.
- 1200 UTC (5:00 pm PDT) – Tropical Storm Andres weakens to a tropical depression.
- 1800 UTC (11:00 pm PDT) – Tropical Depression Andres is downgraded to a trough of low pressure shortly before dissipating.

=== July ===
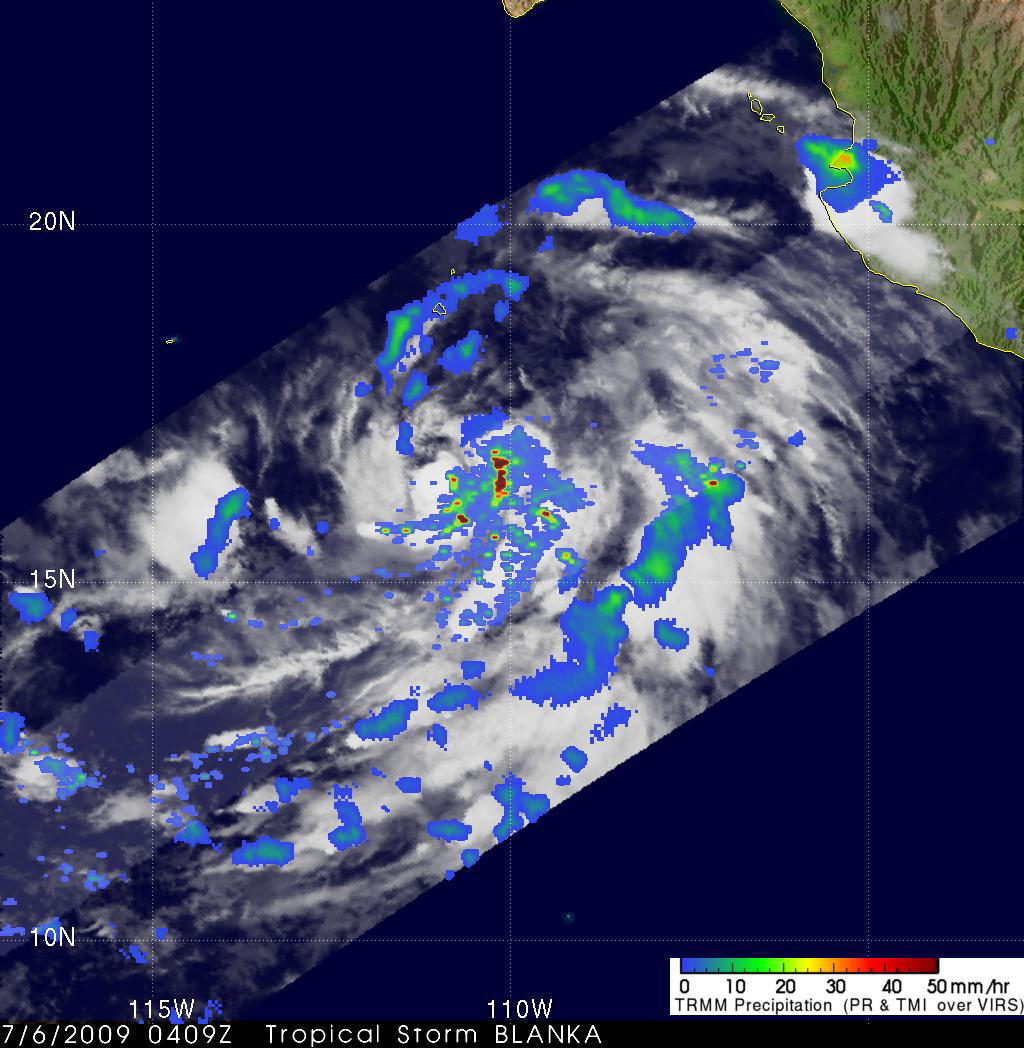
TRMM satellite image of Blanca on July 7 showing rainfall rates exceeding 2 in/h (50 mm/h)

July 6

- 0600 UTC (11:00 pm PDT July 5) – A tropical depression forms about 440 mi (710 km) south of Cabo San Lucas, Mexico.
- 1200 UTC (5:00 am PDT) – The tropical Depression is upgraded to Tropical Storm Blanca.

July 8

- 1200 UTC (5:00 am PDT) – Tropical Storm Blanca weakens back to a tropical depression.

July 9

- 0600 UTC (11:00 pm PDT July 8) – Tropical Depression Blanca weakens into a remnant low about 795 mi (1,279 km) west of Cabo San Lucas, Mexico.

July 10

- 0600 UTC (11:00 pm PDT July 9) – Tropical Depression Four-E forms about 900 mi (1,400 km) south of the southern tip of Baja California.
- 1800 UTC (11:00 am PDT) – Tropical Depression Four-E strengthens into Tropical Storm Carlos.

July 11

- 1800 UTC (11:00 am PDT) – Tropical Storm Carlos strengthens into Hurricane Carlos.

July 13

- 0000 UTC (5:00 pm PDT July 12) – Hurricane Carlos weakens to a tropical storm.

July 14

- 1200 UTC (5:00 am PDT) – Tropical Storm Carlos re-strengthens back into a Category 1 hurricane.

July 15

- 0000 UTC (5:00 pm PDT July 14) – Hurricane Carlos reaches Category 2 intensity.
- 0000 UTC (5:00 pm PDT July 14) – Tropical Depression Five-E forms 795 mi (1,279 km) west-southwest of Manzanillo, Mexico.
- 1200 UTC (5:00 am PDT) – Tropical Depression Five-E strengthens into Tropical Storm Dolores.
- 1800 UTC (11:00 am PDT) – Hurricane Carlos is downgraded to a tropical storm.

July 16

- 0600 UTC (11:00 pm PDT July 15) – Tropical Storm Carlos weakens to a tropical depression.
- 1800 UTC (11:00 am PDT) – Tropical Storm Dolores degenerates into a remnant low.

July

- 0000 UTC (5:00 pm PDT July 16) – Tropical Depression Carlos dissipates.

July 30

- 1200 UTC (8:00 am PDT) – Tropical Depression Six-E forms 1,185 mi (1,907 km) east-southeast of Hilo, Hawaii.
- 1800 UTC (8:00 am HST) – Tropical Depression Six-E enters the Central Pacific Hurricane Center's area of responsibility and is upgraded to Tropical Storm Lana 1,075 mi (1,730 km) east-southeast of Hilo, Hawaii.

=== August ===
August 2

- 1800 UTC (8:00 am HST) – Tropical Storm Lana weakens to a tropical depression.

August 3

- 0000 UTC (2:00 pm HST August 2) – Tropical Depression Lana degenerates into a remnant low.
- 1800 UTC (11:00 am PDT) – Tropical Depression Seven-E forms 670 mi (1,080 km) southwest of Manzanillo, Mexico.
- 1800 UTC (11:00 am PDT) – Tropical Depression Eight-E forms.

August 4

- 0000 UTC (5:00 pm August 3 PDT) – Tropical Depression Seven-E strengthens into Tropical Storm Enrique.
- 0000 UTC (5:00 pm August 3 PDT) – Tropical Depression Eight-E is upgraded to Tropical Storm Felicia 1,140 mi (1,830 km) southwest of the southern tip of Baja California.
- 1800 UTC (11:00 am PDT) – Tropical Storm Felicia is upgraded to Hurricane Felicia.

August 5

- 0600 UTC (11:00 pm PDT August 4) – Hurricane Felicia reaches Category 2 intensity.
- 1200 UTC (5:00 am PDT) – Hurricane Felicia strengthens to a Category 3 major hurricane and becomes the first major hurricane of the 2009 Pacific hurricane season.
- 1800 UTC (11:00 am PDT) – Hurricane Felicia strengthens to a Category 4 hurricane.

August 7

- 0000 UTC (5:00 pm PDT August 6) – Tropical Storm Enrique is downgraded to a tropical depression 910 mi (1,460 km) west-southwest of Punta Eugenia, Mexico.
- 0600 UTC (11:00 pm PDT August 6) – Hurricane Felicia weakens to a Category 3 hurricane.
- 1800 UTC (11:00 am PDT) – Hurricane Felicia weakens to a Category 2 hurricane.

August 8

- 0000 UTC (5:00 pm PDT August 7) – Tropical Depression Enrique degenerates into a remnant low.
- 1200 UTC (2:00 am HST) – Hurricane Felicia weakens to a Category 1 hurricane and enters the Central Pacific Hurricane Center's area of responsibility.

August 9

- 0900 UTC (11:00 pm HST August 8) – Hurricane Felicia is downgraded to a tropical storm 635 mi (1,022 km) east of Hilo, Hawaii.
- 1800 UTC (11:00 am PDT) – Tropical Depression Nine-E forms 885 mi (1,424 km) southwest of the southern tip of Baja California.

August 11

- 0300 UTC (5:00 pm August 10 HST) – Tropical Depression One-C forms south-southwest of Johnston Island.
- 1200 UTC (2:00 am HST) – Tropical Storm Felicia weakens to a tropical depression 140 mi (230 km) northeast of Hilo, Hawaii .
- 1500 UTC (5:00 am HST) – Tropical Depression One-C strengthens into Tropical Storm Maka.
- 2100 UTC (11:00 am HST) – Tropical Depression Felicia degenerates to a remnant low.

August 12

- 0000 UTC (5:00 pm PDT August 11) – Tropical Depression Nine-E degenerates into a remnant low 1,380 mi (2,220 km) west-southwest of the southern tip of Baja California.
- 1200 UTC (5:00 am PDT) – Tropical Depression Ten-E forms 655 mi (1,054 km) south-southwest of the southern tip of Baja California.

August 13

- 0000 UTC (5:00 pm PDT August 12) – Tropical Depression Ten-E strengthens into Tropical Storm Guillermo.

August 14

- 0600 UTC (11:00 pm PDT August 13) – Tropical Storm Guillermo is upgraded to Hurricane Guillermo.
- 1800 UTC (11:00 am PDT) – Hurricane Guillermo reaches Category 2 intensity.

August 15

- 0600 UTC (11:00 pm PDT August 14) – Hurricane Guillermo reaches Category 3 intensity

August 16

- 0000 UTC (5:00 pm PDT August 15) – Hurricane Guillermo weakens to a Category 2 hurricane.
- 1800 UTC (11:00 am PDT) – Hurricane Guillermo weakens to a Category 1 hurricane.

August 17

- 0000 UTC (2:00 pm HST August 16) – Hurricane Guillermo crosses the Central Pacific Hurricane Center's area of responsibility.
- 0600 UTC (8:00 pm HST August 16) – Hurricane Guillermo is downgraded to a tropical storm 850 mi (1,370 km) east of Hilo, Hawaii.

August 19

- 1800 UTC (8:00 am HST) – Tropical Storm Guillermo degenerates to a remnant low 635 mi (1,022 km) north of Hawaii.

August 22

- 1200 UTC (5:00 am PDT) – Tropical Depression Eleven-E forms 1,265 mi (2,036 km) southeast of the Big Island of Hawaii.
- 1800 UTC (11:00 am PDT) – Tropical Depression Eleven-E strengthens into Tropical Storm Hilda.

August 23

- 1200 UTC (2:00 am HST) – Tropical Storm Hilda crosses into the Central Pacific Hurricane Center's area of responsibility.

;August 24

- 1800 UTC (11:00 am PDT) – Tropical Depression Twelve-E forms 690 mi (1,110 km) from the southern tip of Baja California.

August 25

- 0000 UTC (8:00 pm PDT August 24) – Tropical Depression Twelve-E is upgraded to Tropical Storm Ignacio.

August 27

- 0000 UTC (2:00 pm HST August 26) – Tropical Storm Hilda weakens to a tropical depression 495 mi (797 km) south-southeast of the Big Island of Hawaii.
- 0600 UTC (11:00 pm PDT August 26) – Tropical Storm Ignacio weakens to a tropical depression.
- 1200 UTC (5:00 am PDT) – Tropical Depression Ignacio degenerates into a remnant low.

August 28

- 1800 UTC (8:00 am HST) – Tropical Depression Hilda degenerates into a remnant low.

August 29

- 0300 UTC (8:00 pm PDT August 28) – The NHC upgrades a broad area of low pressure off the southwest coast of Mexico to Tropical Depression Thirteen-E.
- 0300 UTC (5:00 pm HST August 28) – The CPHC initiates advisories on Tropical Depression Two-C, the second system to form in the Central Pacific in 2009, 1370 miles west-southwest of Kauai.
- 0900 UTC (2:00 am PDT) – Tropical Depression Thirteen-E strengthens into Tropical Storm Jimena.
- 1500 UTC (8:00 am PDT) – The NHC upgrades Tropical Storm Jimena to a Category 1 hurricane.
- 1500 UTC (8:00 am PDT) – The NHC upgrades a broad area of low pressure out in the open Pacific to Tropical Depression Fourteen-E.
- 2100 UTC (2:00 pm PDT) – The NHC upgrades Hurricane Jimena to a Category 2 hurricane.
- 2100 UTC (2:00 pm PDT) – Tropical Depression Fourteen-E strengthens into Tropical Storm Kevin.

August 30

- 0900 UTC (2:00 am PDT) – The NHC upgrades Hurricane Jimena to a Category 3 hurricane.
- 1500 UTC (8:00 am PDT) – The NHC upgrades Hurricane Jimena to a Category 4 hurricane.

August 31

- 1500 UTC (8:00 am PDT) – Tropical Storm Kevin weakens into a tropical depression.

=== September ===
September 1

- 2100 UTC (2:00 pm PDT) – The NHC issues its last advisory on Tropical Depression Kevin.

September 2

- ca.1900 UTC (12 p.m. PDT) – Hurricane Jimena makes landfall between Puerto San Andresito and San Juanico with 85 mph (135 km/h) winds.

September 3

- 0300 UTC (8 p.m. PDT September 2) – Hurricane Jimena weakens to a tropical storm.

September 4

- 0900 UTC (2 a.m. PDT) – Tropical Storm Jimena weakens into a tropical depression.
- 2100 UTC (2 p.m. PDT) – The NHC issues its last advisory on Tropical Depression Jimena.

September 7

- 0900 UTC (2 a.m. PDT) – The NHC initiates advisories on Tropical Depression Fifteen-E.
- 2100 UTC (2 p.m. PDT) – Tropical Depression Fifteen-E strengthens into Tropical Storm Linda.

September 10

- 0300 UTC (8 p.m. PDT September 9) – Tropical Storm Linda strengthens to a Category 1 hurricane.

September 10

- 2100 UTC (8 p.m. PDT) – Hurricane Linda weakens to a tropical storm.

September 11

- 2100 UTC (8 p.m. PDT) – Tropical Storm Linda weakens to a tropical depression, becoming a remnant low at the same time.

September 16

- 1130 UTC (4:30 am PDT) – The NHC initiates advisories on Tropical Depression Sixteen-E.
- 1500 UTC (8 a.m. PDT) – Tropical Depression Sixteen-E strengthens into Tropical Storm Marty.

September 19

- 0900 UTC (2 a.m. PDT) – Tropical Storm Marty weakens to a tropical depression.
- 2100 UTC (2 p.m. PDT) – Tropical Depression Marty weakens to a remnant low.

September 23

- 0300 UTC (8 p.m. PDT September 22) – Tropical Depression Seventeen-E forms south-southwest of Baja California.
- 0900 UTC (2 a.m. PDT September 23) – Tropical Depression Seventeen-E strengthens into Tropical Storm Nora.

September 25

- 0300 UTC (8 p.m. PDT September 24) – Tropical Storm Nora weakens to a tropical depression.
- 0900 UTC (2 a.m. PDT) – Tropical Depression Nora becomes a remnant low.

=== October ===
October 1

- 1500 UTC (8 a.m. PDT) – The NHC initiates advisories on Tropical Depression Eighteen-E.
- 2100 UTC (2 p.m. PDT) – Tropical Depression Eighteen-E strengthens into Tropical Storm Olaf.

October 3

- 0900 UTC (2 a.m. PDT) – Tropical Storm Olaf weakens to a tropical depression.

October 4

- 0300 UTC (8 p.m. PDT October 3) – Tropical Depression Olaf becomes a remnant low.

October 11

- 2100 UTC (2 p.m. PDT) – The NHC initiates advisories on Tropical Depression Nineteen-E.

October 12

- 0300 UTC (8 p.m. PDT October 11) – Tropical Depression Nineteen-E strengthens into Tropical Storm Patricia.

October 14

- 0600 UTC (11 p.m. PDT October 13) – Tropical Storm Patricia weakens to a tropical depression.
- 0900 UTC (2 a.m. PDT) – Tropical Depression Patricia degenerates into a remnant low.

October 15

- 2100 UTC (2 p.m. PDT) – The NHC initiates advisories on Tropical Depression Twenty-E.

October 16

- 0300 UTC (8 p.m. PDT October 15) – Tropical Depression Twenty-E strengthens into Tropical Storm Rick.
- 1500 UTC (8 a.m. PDT) – Tropical Storm Rick strengthens into a Category 1 hurricane.

October 17

- 0300 UTC (8 p.m. PDT October 16) – Hurricane Rick strengthens into a Category 2 hurricane.
- 0900 UTC (2 a.m. PDT) – Hurricane Rick strengthens into a Category 3 hurricane.
- 0937 UTC (2:37 am PDT) – Hurricane Rick rapidly strengthens into a Category 4 hurricane.
- 2210 UTC (3:10 pm PDT) – Hurricane Rick strengthens into a Category 5 hurricane, the first in the eastern Pacific since Hurricane Kenna in 2002.

October 18

- 0300 UTC (8 p.m. PDT October 17) – Hurricane Rick becomes the second strongest hurricane ever recorded in the eastern Pacific with 180 mph (285 km/h) winds.
- 2100 UTC (11 a.m. HST) – Tropical Depression Three-C forms 905 miles (1455 km) south-southeast of Honolulu.

October 19

- 0300 UTC (8 p.m. PDT October 18) – Hurricane Rick weakens to a Category 4 hurricane.
- 0900 UTC (2 a.m. PDT) – Hurricane Rick weakens to a Category 3 hurricane.
- 1500 UTC (5 a.m. HST) – Tropical Depression Three-C strengthens into Tropical Storm Neki.
- 1800 UTC (11 a.m. PDT) – Hurricane Rick weakens to a Category 2 hurricane.

October 20

- 0000 UTC (5 p.m. PDT October 19) – Hurricane Rick weakens to a Category 1 hurricane.
- 0300 UTC (8 p.m. PDT October 19) – Hurricane Rick weakens to a tropical storm.

October 21

- 0000 UTC (2 p.m. HST October 20) – Tropical Storm Neki strengthens into a Category 1 hurricane.
- ca.1400 UTC (7 a.m. PDT) – Tropical Storm Rick makes landfall near Mazatlán with 55 mph (90 km/h) winds.
- 1500 UTC (5 a.m. HST) – Hurricane Neki strengthens into a Category 2 hurricane.
- 1500 UTC (11 a.m. PDT) – Tropical Storm Rick weakens to a tropical depression.
- 2100 UTC (2 p.m. PDT) – Tropical Depression Rick weakens to a remnant low and the NHC issues their last advisory.
- 2100 UTC (11 a.m. HST) – Hurricane Neki strengthens into a Category 3 hurricane.

October 23

- 1500 UTC (5 a.m. HST) – Hurricane Neki weakens to a tropical storm.

=== November ===
- No tropical cyclones form during the month of November.

November 30

- The 2009 Pacific hurricane season officially ends.

== See also ==
- Pacific hurricane season
- Timeline of the 2009 Atlantic hurricane season
