= Hurricane Andres (2009) =

Category 1 Pacific hurricane in 2009

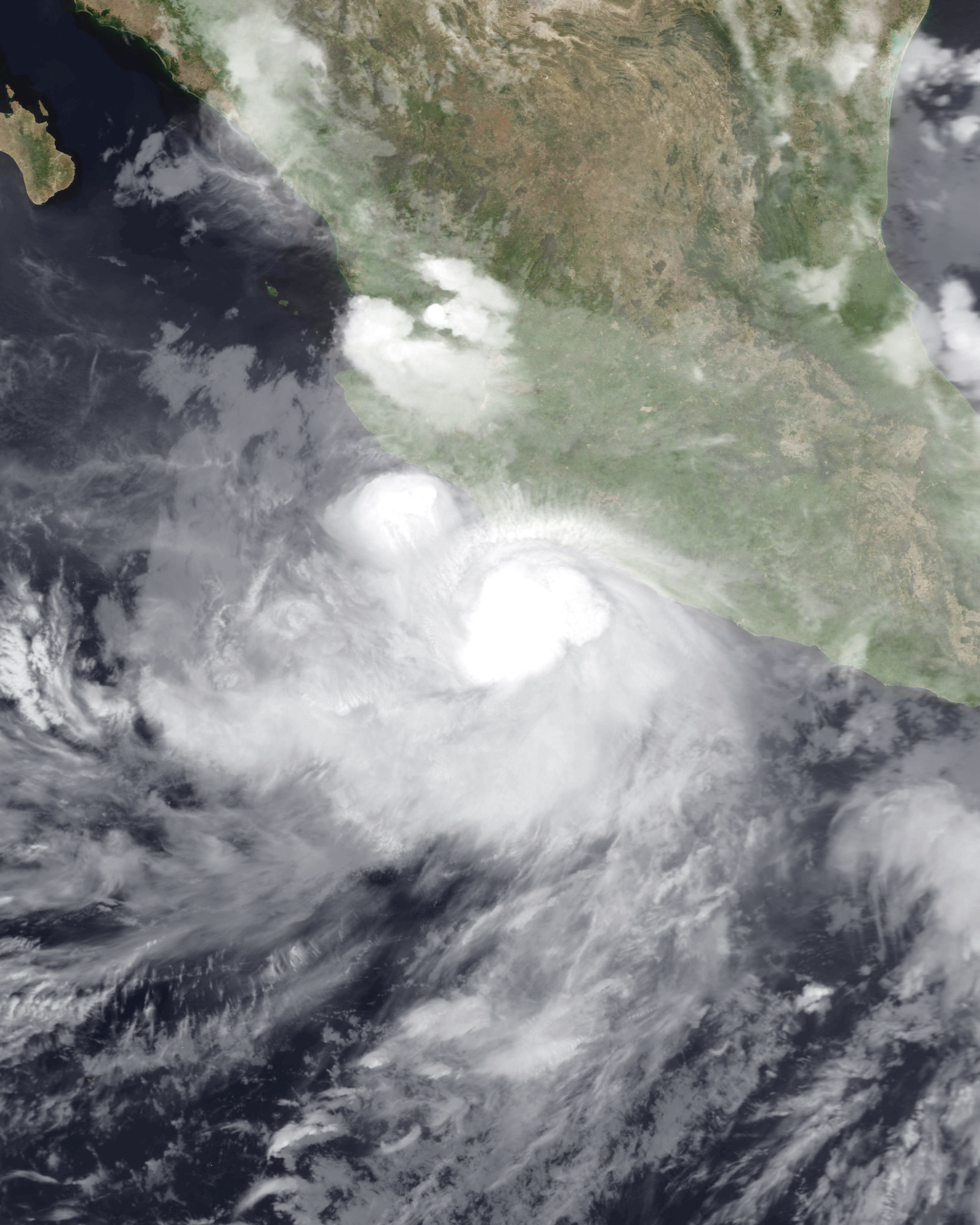
- Andres at peak intensity on June 23

Meteorological history
- Formed: June 21, 2009
- Dissipated: June 24, 2009

Category 1 hurricane
- 1-minute sustained (SSHWS/NWS)
- Highest winds: 80 mph (130 km/h)
- Lowest pressure: 984 mbar (hPa); 29.06 inHg

Overall effects
- Fatalities: 3 direct, 2 indirect
- Damage: $231,000
- Areas affected: Mexico, Honduras
- IBTrACS /
- Part of the 2009 Pacific hurricane season

Hurricane Andres was the first named storm and hurricane of the 2009 Pacific hurricane season. Forming on June 21, Andres gradually intensified as it tracked along the Mexican coastline. Deep convection developed around the center of circulation and by June 23, the storm attained hurricane-status, peaking with winds of 80 mph (130 km/h). Upon attaining this intensity, the storm featured a developing eyewall within a central dense overcast. Within 36 hours, the storm rapidly degenerated, having most of the convection being displaced by high wind shear, becoming a non-tropical trough during the afternoon of June 24.

Prior to becoming a tropical depression, Andres produced heavy rainfall in Oaxaca and Honduras, resulting in two deaths. Rough seas off the coast of Guerrero resulted in one fatality. Inland, flooding caused by heavy rains killed two additional people. An additional 20 people were injured. Several dozen structures were damaged and a few were destroyed. Total losses from the hurricane reached MXN 3 million ($231,000 USD) in Colima. Following the storm, roughly 350 people were left homeless.

== Meteorological history ==
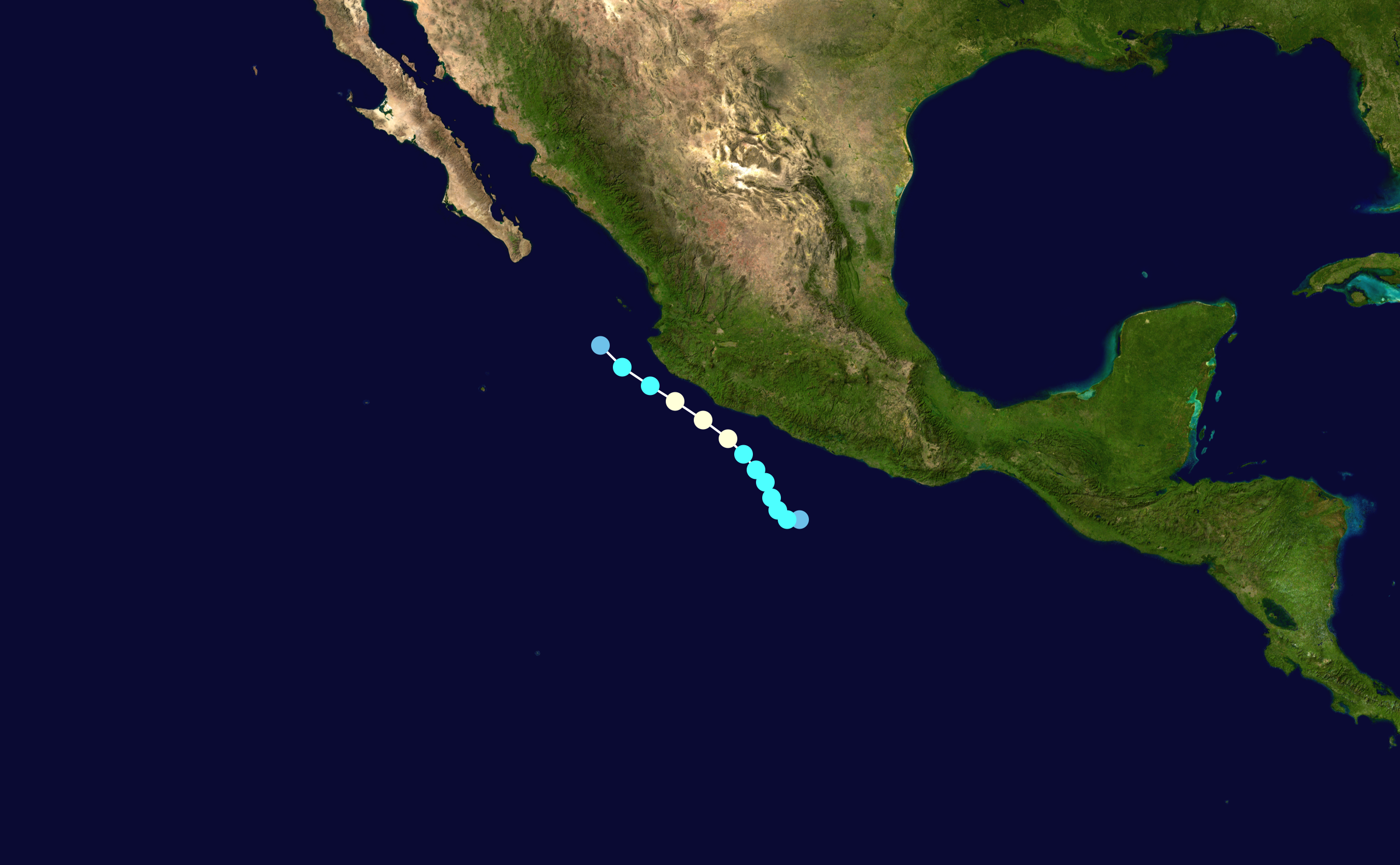
Map plotting the storm's track and intensity, according to the Saffir–Simpson scale Map key Saffir–Simpson scale Tropical depression (≤38 mph, ≤62 km/h) Tropical storm (39–73 mph, 63–118 km/h) Category 1 (74–95 mph, 119–153 km/h) Category 2 (96–110 mph, 154–177 km/h) Category 3 (111–129 mph, 178–208 km/h) Category 4 (130–156 mph, 209–251 km/h) Category 5 (≥157 mph, ≥252 km/h) Unknown Storm type Tropical cyclone Subtropical cyclone Extratropical cyclone, remnant low, tropical disturbance, or monsoon depression

Hurricane Andres originated out of a tropical wave that entered the eastern Pacific basin on June 16 after crossing Central America. Over the following few days, showers and thunderstorms began to organize around the wave. At this time, the National Hurricane Center (NHC) remarked upon the possibility for tropical cyclogenesis. By June 20, the wave spawned an area of low pressure roughly 175 mi (280 km) south-southeast of Acapulco, Mexico. Around 1200 UTC the following day, the system had become sufficiently organized for the NHC to designate the low as Tropical Depression Two-E. The depression briefly track westward before turning towards the northwest, a track which it would maintain for the remained of its existence, due to a mid-tropospheric ridge located northeast of the system.

It continued to organize throughout the day on June 21, developing banding features and increased convection. Several hours after being classified a depression, the system intensified into a tropical storm, at which time it received the name Andres. Upon being named, Andres marked latest date that the first named storm of a season developed since 1969 when Tropical Storm Ava developed on July 1 of that year. By the morning of June 22, very deep thunderstorm activity existed near the center, and the overall convective pattern had become more symmetric in nature. Favorable conditions, warm sea surface temperatures, allowed Andres to gradually intensify as it tracked near the Mexican coastline. However, strong wind shear, a factor that generally weakens tropical cyclones, had little effect on the developing storm.

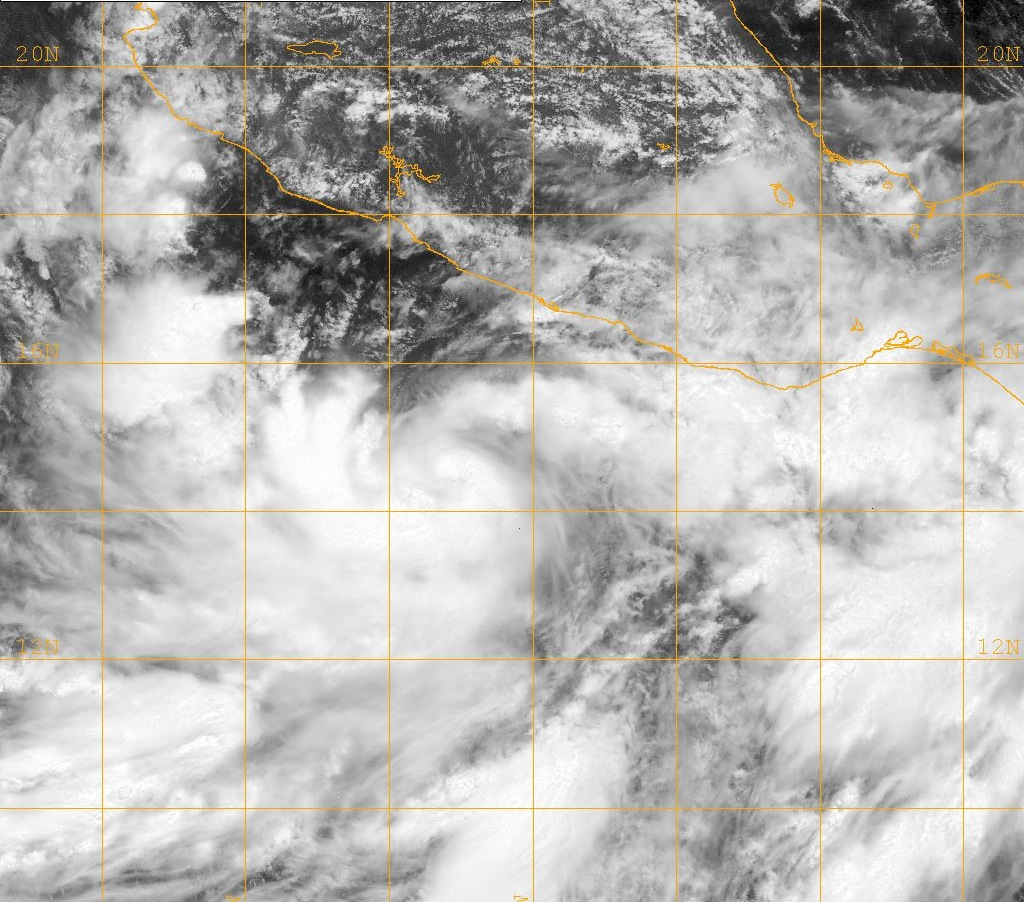
Tropical Depression Two-E upon being classified

By the evening of June 22, satellite imagery indicated the formation of an eyewall; by this time Andres was near hurricane status. Early the next day, the center of circulation became embedded within a central dense overcast and Andres intensified into a hurricane, the first of the season, around 0600 UTC. At this time, the storm attained its peak intensity with winds of 80 mph (130 km/h) and a minimum barometric pressure of 984 mbar (hPa; 29.06 inHg); the storm was located roughly 80 mi (130 km) southwest of Lázaro Cárdenas upon attaining this intensity. Twelve hours after becoming a hurricane, most of the deep convection associated with the storm had weakened; however, Hurricane Hunters still recorded 75 mph (120 km/h) winds despite the ragged appearance of Andres.

By the evening of June 23, Andres weakened to a tropical storm due to increasing wind shear, decreasing sea surface temperatures as it entered a more stable air mass. The system began to rapidly degenerate, as convection became dislocated from the center and the overall structure of Andres degraded. By 1200 UTC on June 24, the storm weakened into a tropical depression while situated roughly 100 mi (155 km) west of Cabo Corrientes, Jalisco. Shortly after, the depression sharply turned north and degenerated into a trough of low pressure, no longer a tropical cyclone.

== Preparations and impact ==
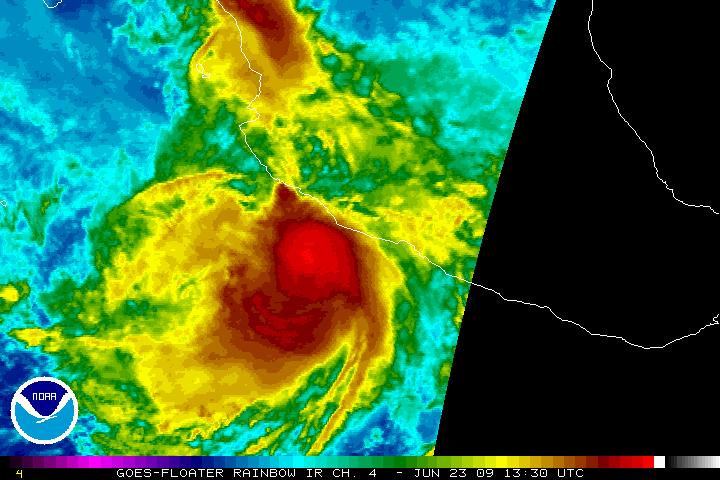
Infrared satellite image of Andres near the Mexican coastline

The NHC issued several watches and warnings for portions of the Mexican coastline; the first was a tropical storm watch for areas between Zihuatanejo and Manzanillo on June 22. Several hours later, a portion of the watch was upgraded to a warning as Andres neared the coastline. By 1500 UTC, a hurricane watch was declared for areas between Lázaro Cárdenas, Michoacán, and Cabo Corrientes, Jalisco, and the tropical storm watch for Zihuatanejo to Lázaro Cárdenas was discontinued. Roughly six hours later, a hurricane warning was raised for Punto San Telmo to Cabo Corrientes and the tropical storm warning and hurricane watch were extended northward to Punto San Telmo. By the following afternoon, the hurricane watch was discontinued and several hours later, areas under a tropical storm warning followed suit. Early on June 24, all watches and warnings associated with Andres were discontinued as it rapidly dissipated offshore. Authorities closed ports in Lázaro Cárdenas, Manzanillo and Puerto Vallarta because of rough seas. Schools throughout Colima were closed prior to the storm and Mexican officials raised the awareness level to orange.

Prior to classification as a tropical cyclone, the storm dropped over 160 mm (6.3 in) of rainfall in some areas, triggering flooding and landslides. Heavy rain, produced by the wave that spawned Andres, in Honduras killed two people. A river overflowed its banks, flooding homes and surrounding land. On Mexican Federal Highway 200, gusty winds blew down about fifteen trees. In the city of Acapulco, it was reported that fallen trees damaged two cars. Rough seas led to the drowning of a fishermen in a lagoon near Tecpan de Galeana, Guerrero, while flooding caused by the storm prompted the evacuation of 200 people; 14 shelters were opened to accommodate the evacuees. Additionally, some trees were downed along the coast. Swells up to 4 m (13 ft) caused structural damage along the Mexican coastline, with the worst being around Acapulco where several bars and restaurants were damaged or destroyed. In Jalisco, 20 temporary shelters were opened to house evacuees following the storm. The Civil Protection System prepared relief materials, consisting of 600 blankets, 600 mattresses and 700 cots to house people in emergency shelters.

In the municipality of Atoyac de Alvarez, in the community of Cerro Prieto, 350 people were left homeless by the storm. Similarly, the paths that connect the towns of San Vicente de Jesus San Vicente and La Soledad Benítez-Paradise in this town, there were cuts in solitary vehicle traffic. In the community of La Soledad, heavy rains accompanied by hail hit 38 homes, crops and coffee grounds cultivation in the region. In Colima, 50 homes and two hotels were inundated by flood waters, leaving MXN 3 million ($231,000 USD) in damage. In Puebla, heavy rains produced by the outer bands of the hurricane triggered flooding that killed two people. In addition to the fatalities, 20 people were injured by the storm. In the wake of the storm, the Government of Mexico allocated roughly MXN 3 million (US$231,000) in funds which would be distributed to 96 businesses significantly affected by the storm. These funds accounted for supplies, such as refrigerators and stoves to help restart their industries.

== See also ==
- List of Pacific hurricanes
- 2009 Pacific hurricane season
- Timeline of the 2009 Pacific hurricane season
