= Tropical Depression One-E (2009) =

Pacific tropical depression in 2009

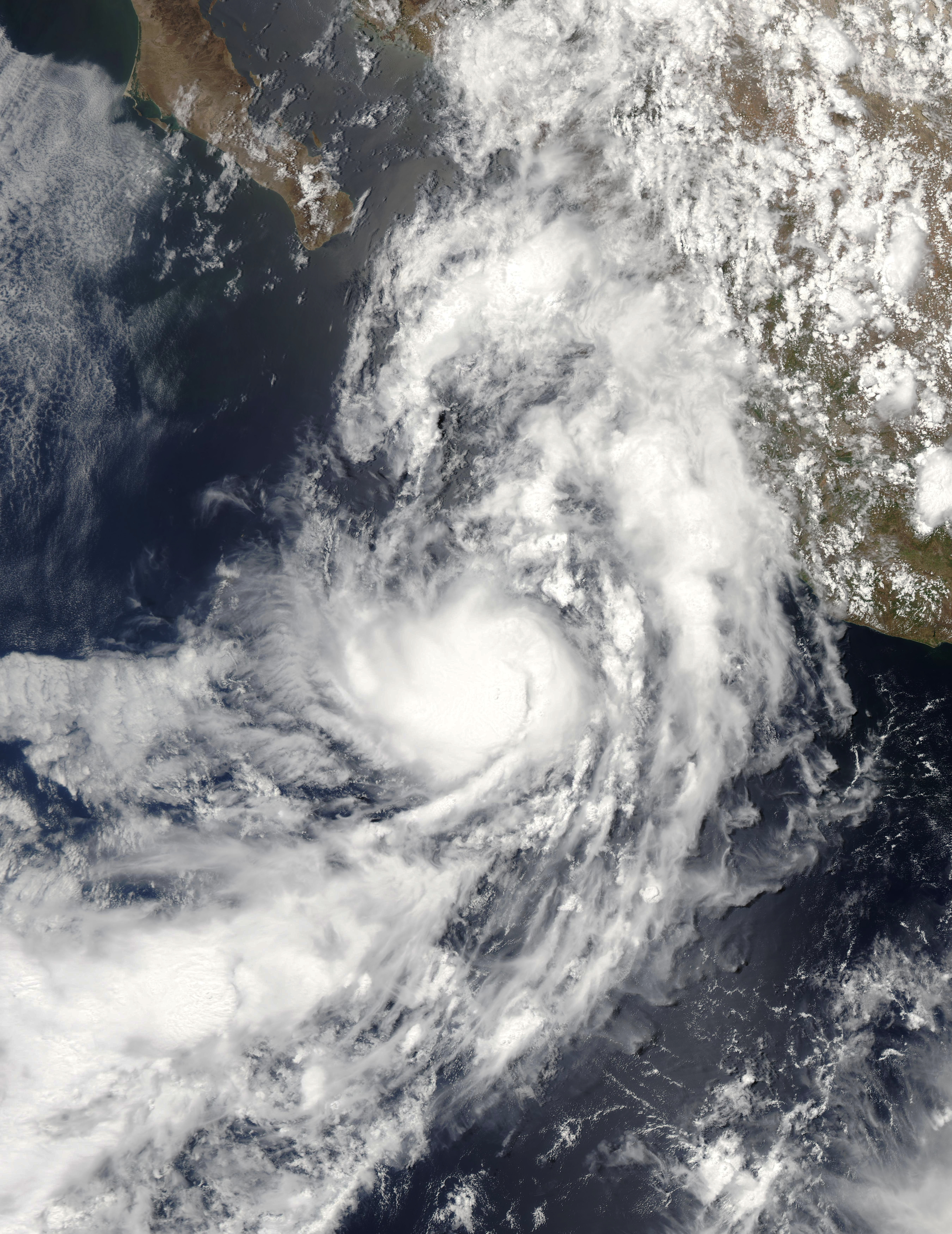
- Tropical Depression One-E at peak intensity

Meteorological history
- Formed: June 18, 2009
- Dissipated: June 19, 2009

Tropical depression
- 1-minute sustained (SSHWS/NWS)
- Highest winds: 35 mph (55 km/h)
- Lowest pressure: 1003 mbar (hPa); 29.62 inHg

Overall effects
- Fatalities: None
- Areas affected: Sinaloa, Nayarit and Jalisco
- IBTrACS /
- Part of the 2009 Pacific hurricane season

Tropical Depression One-E was the earliest tropical cyclone in the calendar year to impact the Mexican state of Sinaloa ever recorded. The first system of the 2009 Pacific hurricane season, One-E formed out of an area of disturbed weather on June 18, 2009, and initially tracked slowly northwards. Throughout the day, convection developed around the center of circulation and the system was anticipated to become a tropical storm. Late on June 18, the National Hurricane Center noted that the system was on the verge of becoming a tropical storm; it would have been named Andres had this occurred. However, the following day, strong wind shear caused the depression to rapidly degenerate into a trough of low pressure before dissipating off the coast of Sinaloa.

Although no longer a tropical cyclone, the remnants of the depression brought moderate rainfall to parts of Sinaloa, Nayarit and Jalisco. High winds accompanied the rainfall and left about 50,000 residences without power. Several trees were downed and some structures sustained damage from fresh water flooding. Landslides occurred along major highways and significant structural damage was reported around Mazatlán. However, there was no loss of life or reports of injuries.

== Meteorological history ==
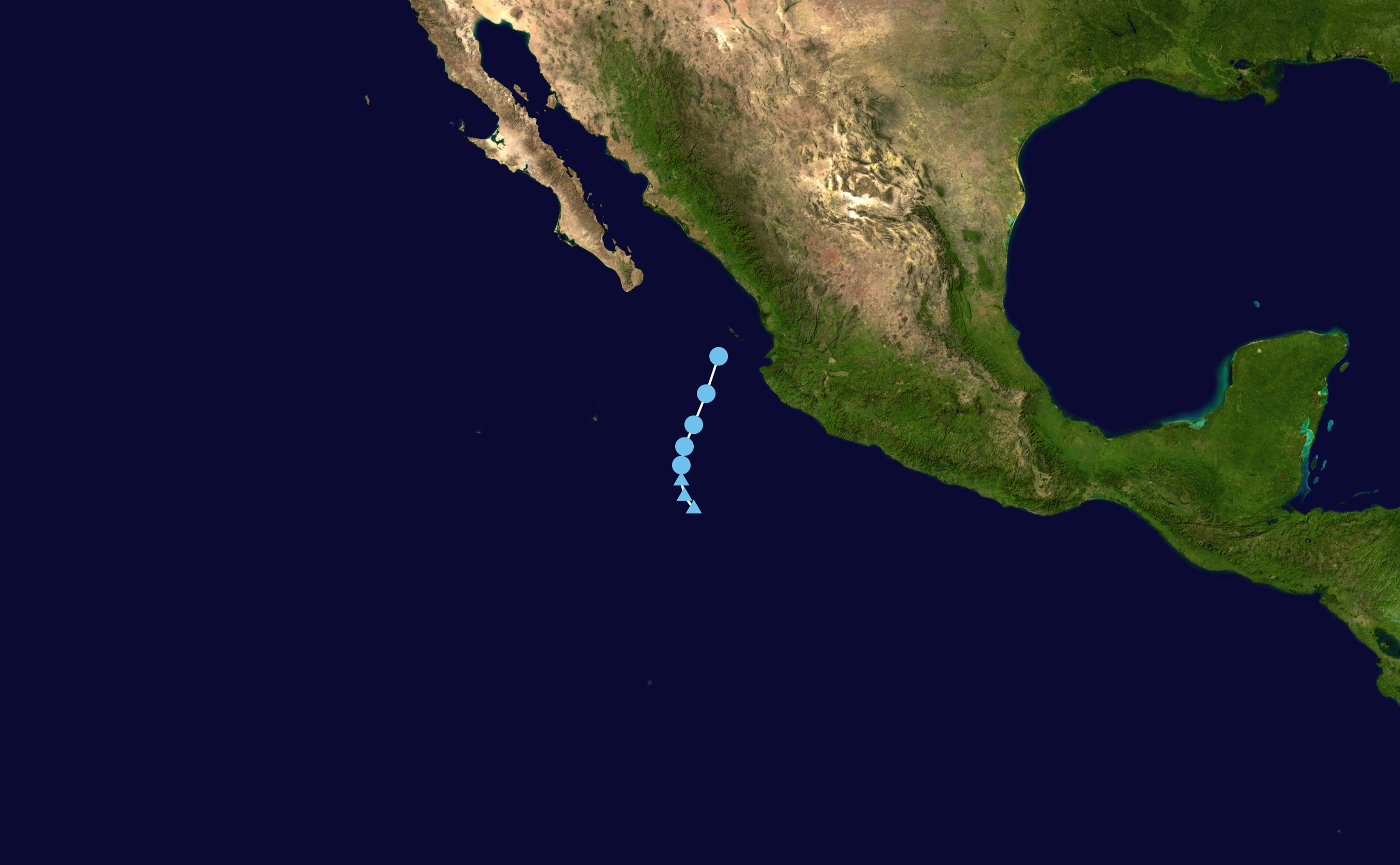
Map plotting the storm's track and intensity, according to the Saffir–Simpson scale Map key Saffir–Simpson scale Tropical depression (≤38 mph, ≤62 km/h) Tropical storm (39–73 mph, 63–118 km/h) Category 1 (74–95 mph, 119–153 km/h) Category 2 (96–110 mph, 154–177 km/h) Category 3 (111–129 mph, 178–208 km/h) Category 4 (130–156 mph, 209–251 km/h) Category 5 (≥157 mph, ≥252 km/h) Unknown Storm type Tropical cyclone Subtropical cyclone Extratropical cyclone, remnant low, tropical disturbance, or monsoon depression

Tropical Depression One-E originated from a tropical wave that exited the coast of Africa on May 29. Little convective activity was associated with the system as it traveled across the Atlantic Ocean and Caribbean Sea. On June 10, the wave crossed Central America and entered the northeastern Pacific basin. Over the following few days, the system gradually became better organized and on June 15, an area of low pressure developed from the wave. The system continued to organize, and on June 17 the National Hurricane Center (NHC) noted the likelihood for tropical cyclogenesis; although, at the time, the circulation was not well-defined. It organized further, and on June 18, the NHC initiated advisories on the first tropical depression of the 2009 season about 350 miles (565 km) south-southwest of Mazatlán, Sinaloa. Deep convection persisted near the southern portion of the depression; however, the northern portion of the depression was partially devoid of convective activity. The depression traveled northward along the periphery of a mid-level ridge over Mexico and an unusually strong mid to upper-level trough situated over the Baja California Peninsula.

Later on June 18, forecast models indicated that the system might rapidly degenerate prior to landfall. However, the NHC continued to forecast that the depression would attain tropical storm-status before landfall. Shortly after, the depression became increasingly disorganized as convection separated from the center of circulation due to increasing wind shear. Stable air ahead of the system inhibited the possibility of rapid development as warm waters supported intensification. By the morning of June 19, the center of circulation was situated along the southern edge of deep convection, indicating that the depression was beginning to degenerate. Despite this, the NHC continued to anticipate intensification prior to landfall. Embedded within an easterly flow ahead of a mid-level trough, the storm turned towards the north-northeast and accelerated slightly. At 11:00 am PDT (1800 UTC), the depression reached its peak intensity with winds of 35 mph (55 km/h) and a barometric pressure of 1003 mbar (hPa; 29.62 inHg). Operationally, the depression was considered to be slightly stronger, having a minimum pressure of 1001 mbar (hPa; 29.56 inHg). Later that day, the depression began to degenerate into an open trough as it was situated underneath cirrus clouds instead of cumulonimbus clouds. Visible satellite imagery showed that the depression became increasingly ill-defined and the NHC estimated that the depression degenerated into a trough of low pressure near the Islas Marías during the afternoon of June 19. The remnants of the depression were monitored by the United States Naval Research Laboratory for several more hours until the system moved inland over Sinaloa.

== Preparations and impact ==
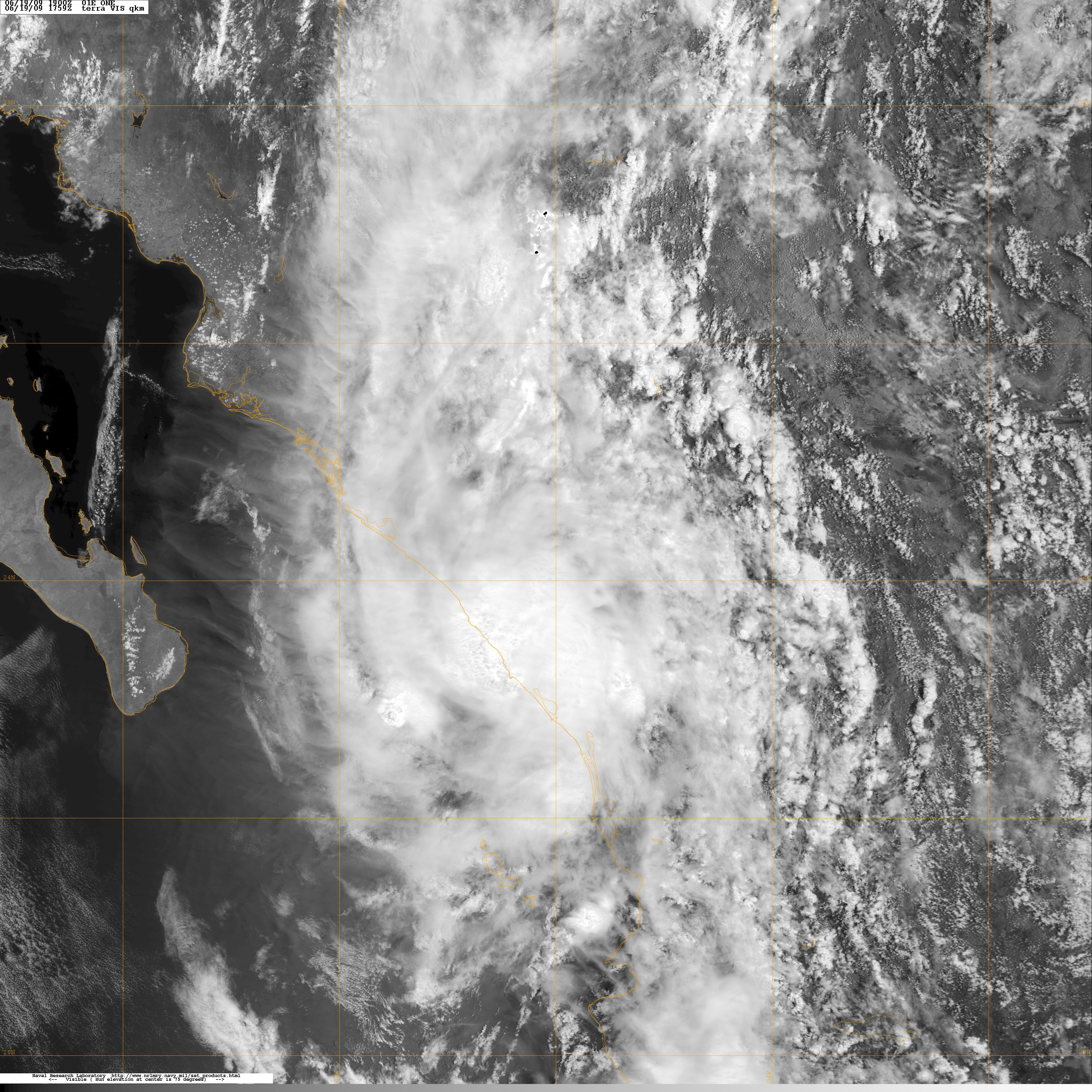
Remnants of the depression moving over Sinaloa

When the storm was declared a depression on June 18, a tropical storm watch was declared by the Mexican Government for the Islas Marías, as well as for areas between Topolobampo and El Roblito in Sinaloa. The captain of the Mazatlán port advised ships to remain at port due to rough seas. A blue alert was declared for Sinaloa due to the possibility of deadly mudslides. Crews throughout the state quickly cleared debris from streams and streets to allow for better drainage. Shelters were prepped for possible evacuees but never opened. Late on June 18, a tropical storm warning was declared for the Islas Marías and the watch along Sinaloa was extended southward to Cabo Corrientes, Jalisco. The following day, the Government of Mexico discontinued the warning for the Islas Marías and the watch for areas south of El Roblito was also discontinued. Upon the storm's sudden dissipation later that day, the remaining watch areas were discontinued.

On June 19, 2.44 in (62 mm) of rain fell in Mazatlán, near where the remnants of the depression moved ashore. Rainfall rates in the region exceeded 1 in/h (25 mm/h) at times. High winds in Mazatlán knocked down several trees, cutting power to local residents. Heavy rains also triggered street flooding throughout the city. Several hours after the storm, electric companies reported that an estimated 50,000 residences were without power. Following an assessment of damage to the power grid, 20 power poles were found to have been damaged, 15 circuit breakers were damaged and 15 sections of power lines were downed. Numerous villages were flooded, some requiring the evacuation of residents. Around 11:00 am PDT (1800 UTC) six people were stranded offshore Sinaloa. High winds caused significant structural damage throughout Mazatlán.

Traffic lights were downed by high winds, causing numerous traffic delays. Landslides along major roadways caused several accidents, one involving a bus that was damaged by rocks. One business was significantly damaged, with at least one main wall collapsing. To speed up the removal of debris, members of the Mexican army were deployed throughout Sinaloa. According to officials in Mexico, Tropical Depression One-E was the first known tropical cyclone to impact the state of Sinaloa during the month of June on record. With the system impacting land on June 19, it marked the earliest date that a tropical cyclone had impacted the state, with the average date of first impact being August 15.

== See also ==
- Tropical cyclones in 2009
- Timeline of the 2009 Pacific hurricane season
