= Tropical Storm Patricia (2009) =

Pacific tropical storm in 2009

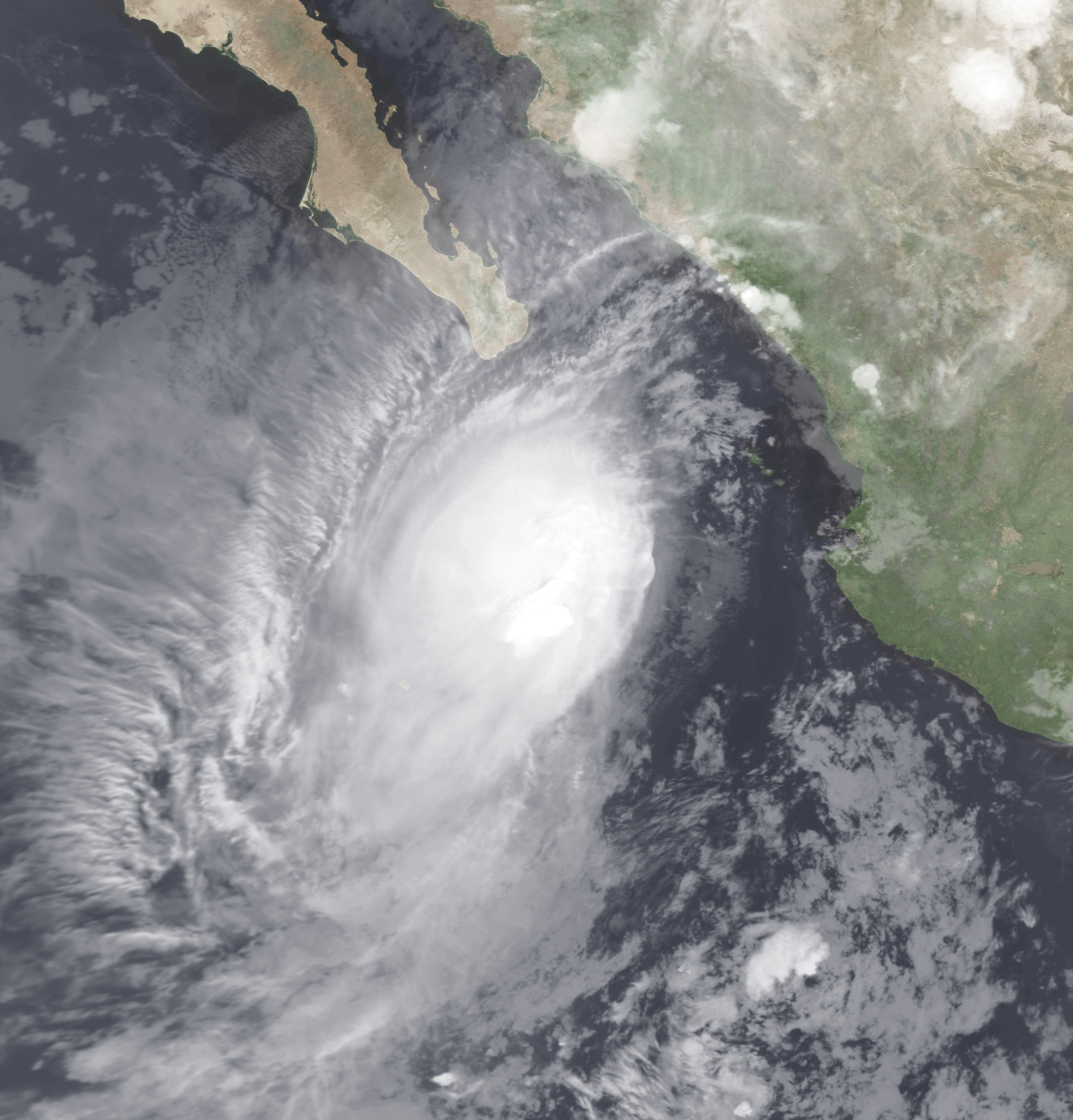
- Tropical Storm Patricia at peak intensity on October 13

Meteorological history
- Formed: October 11, 2009
- Remnant low: October 14, 2009
- Dissipated: October 15, 2009

Tropical storm
- 1-minute sustained (SSHWS/NWS)
- Highest winds: 60 mph (95 km/h)
- Lowest pressure: 996 mbar (hPa); 29.41 inHg

Overall effects
- Fatalities: None reported
- Areas affected: Baja California Sur, Sinaloa, Sonora and Chihuahua
- IBTrACS
- Part of the 2009 Pacific hurricane season

Tropical Storm Patricia was a short-lived tropical cyclone that briefly affected parts of Baja California Sur before rapidly degenerating over water. Developing from a tropical wave that traversed the Atlantic Ocean during September 2009, Patricia was first classified as a tropical depression on October 11 several hundred miles south of the Baja California Peninsula. The system quickly intensified into a tropical storm as it tracked in a general northward direction. By October 12, Patricia attained its peak intensity with winds of 60 mph (95 km/h) and a minimum barometric pressure of 996 mbar (hPa; 29.41 inHg). The following day, increasing wind shear and unfavorable conditions caused the storm to rapidly weaken. By the morning of October 14, Patricia had degenerated into a non-convective remnant low near the southern coastline of Baja California Sur. The remnants of the storm persisted until October 15, at which time they dissipated over open waters.

Although the center of Patricia did not impact land, the outer bands caused significant rainfall in portions of western Mexico. In Sonora, up to 240 mm (9.4 in) of rain fell, leading to significant flooding that left 600 people homeless. Other Mexican states received similar impact. Overall, the effects of Patricia were minor and resulted in no loss of life.

== Meteorological history ==
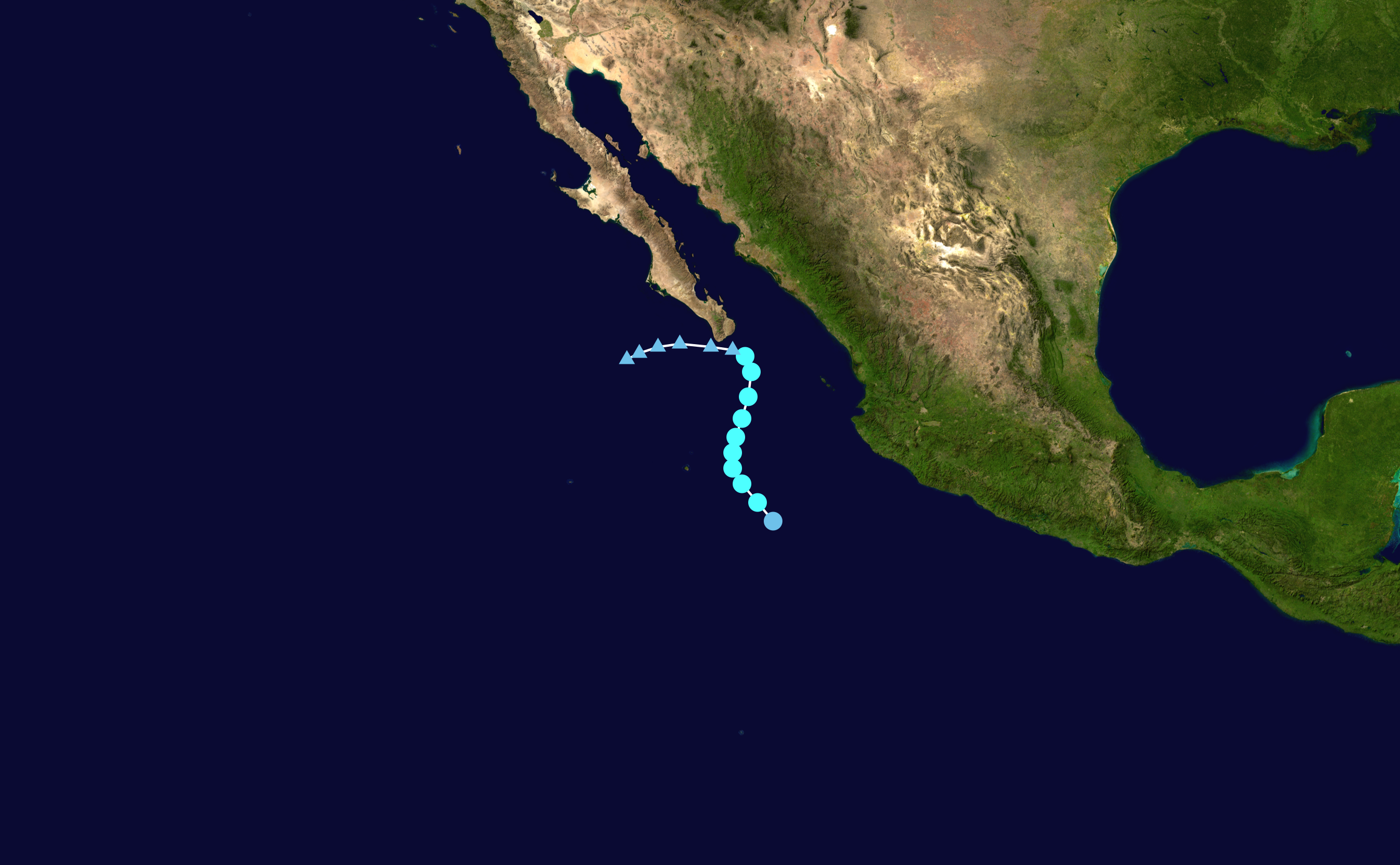
Map plotting the storm's track and intensity, according to the Saffir–Simpson scale Map key Saffir–Simpson scale Tropical depression (≤38 mph, ≤62 km/h) Tropical storm (39–73 mph, 63–118 km/h) Category 1 (74–95 mph, 119–153 km/h) Category 2 (96–110 mph, 154–177 km/h) Category 3 (111–129 mph, 178–208 km/h) Category 4 (130–156 mph, 209–251 km/h) Category 5 (≥157 mph, ≥252 km/h) Unknown Storm type Tropical cyclone Subtropical cyclone Extratropical cyclone, remnant low, tropical disturbance, or monsoon depression

Tropical Storm Patricia originated from a tropical wave that moved off the west coast of Africa on September 23. Two days later, Tropical Depression Eight developed from the wave over the eastern Atlantic Ocean. The depression tracked northwestward, while the wave continued a steady westward track. By October 6, the system crossed Central America and entered the eastern Pacific Ocean. Gradual development took place over the following several days with widespread, scattered convection consolidating around a developing area of low pressure. On October 11, a well-defined circulation had formed and the National Hurricane Center (NHC) estimated that it developed into a tropical depression roughly 405 mi (650 km) south-southeast of the southern tip of Baja California Sur.

Several hours later, the system further strengthened into a tropical storm and was named Patricia. The low-level circulation became embedded within very deep convection and further intensification was anticipated. Patricia tracked north-northwest in a region of low to moderate wind shear, under the steering currents of a strong ridge of high pressure to the east and a trough located northwest. Although over warm sea surface temperatures, relatively stable air aloft prevented substantial intensification. By the late morning of October 12, the overall extent of cloud cover had increased but the center became less defined. Later that day, Patricia attained its peak intensity as a moderately strong tropical storm with winds of 60 mph (95 km/h) and a minimum barometric pressure of 996 mbar (hPa; 29.41 inHg).

The storm maintained this intensity for several hours as its central dense overcast remained intact despite increasing wind shear. However, the NHC stated that there was a 20% chance of the storm becoming a hurricane within 24 hours based on climatological factors and the average forecast intensity errors. However, this did not take place. The combination of moderate wind shear and a stable environment caused Patricia to rapidly weaken on October 13. The storm's cirrus outflow became weak in all directions and convection diminished. Later that day, convective developed ceased to occur as the storm neared the south tip of Baja California Sur. Early on October 14, Patricia degenerated into a remnant low pressure area, bypassing tropical depression status, roughly 30 mi (50 km) south of the Baja California Peninsula. The remnant low turned westward and tracked over open waters before dissipating on October 15.

== Preparations and impact ==
Several hours after Patricia was classified as a tropical storm on October 12, the National Hurricane Center issued a tropical storm watch for areas along Baja California Sur between La Paz and Santa Fe. The following day, the watch was upgraded to a tropical storm warning for areas between Buenavista and Agua Blanca. However, the storm's rapid decay on October 14 allowed the watches and warnings to be discontinued. Officials in the threatened region began preparing by closing schools and opening 159 shelters on October 12. The Civil Protection Department was prepared to evacuate residents in low-lying area if necessary. Resorts and hotels cancelled all outdoor activities and brought all loose objects indoors. The city of Los Cabos was placed under a state of emergency as flooding rains were forecast to impact the area. Ports in the region were also shut down due to rough seas.

The storm's quick deterioration led to significantly less impact than anticipated. High waves affected the coastlines of Baja California Sur, Sinaloa and Nayarit. Parts of Sinaloa also recorded heavy rainfall from Patricia, peaking at 184.5 mm (7.26 in) in Higuera de Zaragoza. Subsequent flooding was reported in 12 municipalities in the state, resulting in the evacuation of 3,000 people. Officials also closed elementary schools throughout the affected area due to the anticipation of flood waters. In southern Sonora, rainfall up to 240 mm (9.4 in) led to widespread flooding. Officials reported that 181 people sought refuge in shelters. Additionally, relief agencies supplied 500 people with food during the storm. A total of 2,272 hectares (5,614 acres) of agricultural land was inundated by flood waters. Roughly 815 people were left homeless in the wake of the storm, 600 of whom were in Sonora.

== See also ==
- Other systems named Patricia
- Timeline of the 2009 Pacific hurricane season
- List of Eastern Pacific tropical storms
- Tropical Storm Julio (2008)
- Tropical Storm Georgette (2010)
