= Hurricane Neki =

Category 3 Pacific hurricane in 2009

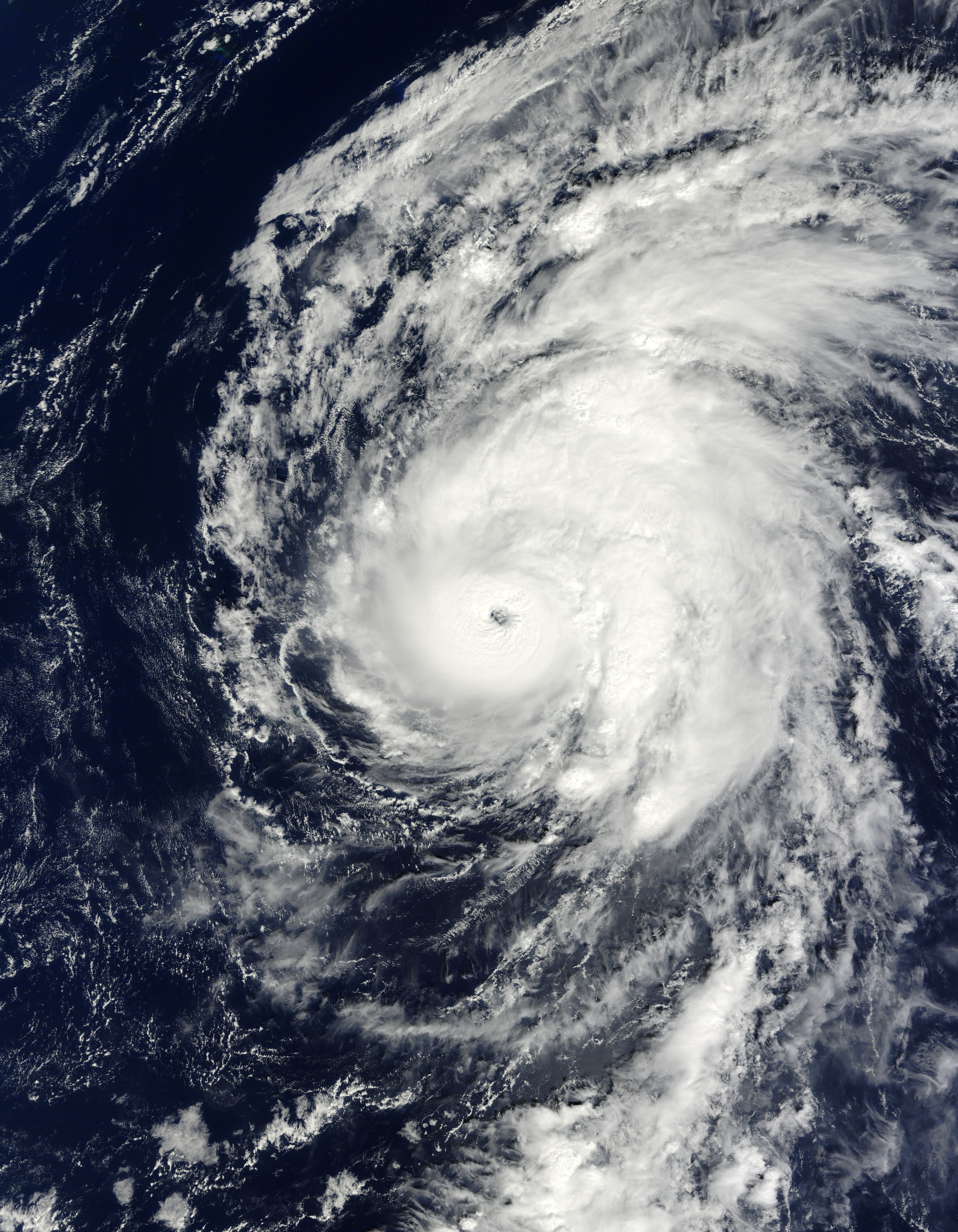
- Hurricane Neki strengthening on October 21

Meteorological history
- Formed: October 18, 2009
- Dissipated: October 27, 2009

Category 3 major hurricane
- 1-minute sustained (SSHWS/NWS)
- Highest winds: 125 mph (205 km/h)
- Lowest pressure: 950 mbar (hPa); 28.05 inHg

Overall effects
- Fatalities: None reported
- Damage: Minimal
- Areas affected: Northwestern Hawaiian Islands
- IBTrACS
- Part of the 2009 Pacific hurricane season

Hurricane Neki was the final tropical cyclone of the 2009 Pacific hurricane season. It developed on October 18 as an unusually large disturbance from a trough south of Hawaii. Moving northwestward, it organized only slowly at first due to its large size. After reaching hurricane status on October 21, Neki intensified at a much faster rate and peaked with winds of 125 mph (205 km/h). It later turned to the north and north-northeast and weakened due to hostile conditions. While passing through the Papahānaumokuākea Marine National Monument, Neki was downgraded to a tropical storm after the center became exposed from the deepest convection. It caused little impact in the island chain. After stalling and executing a small loop, Neki resumed its northward track and dissipated on October 27.

== Meteorological history ==
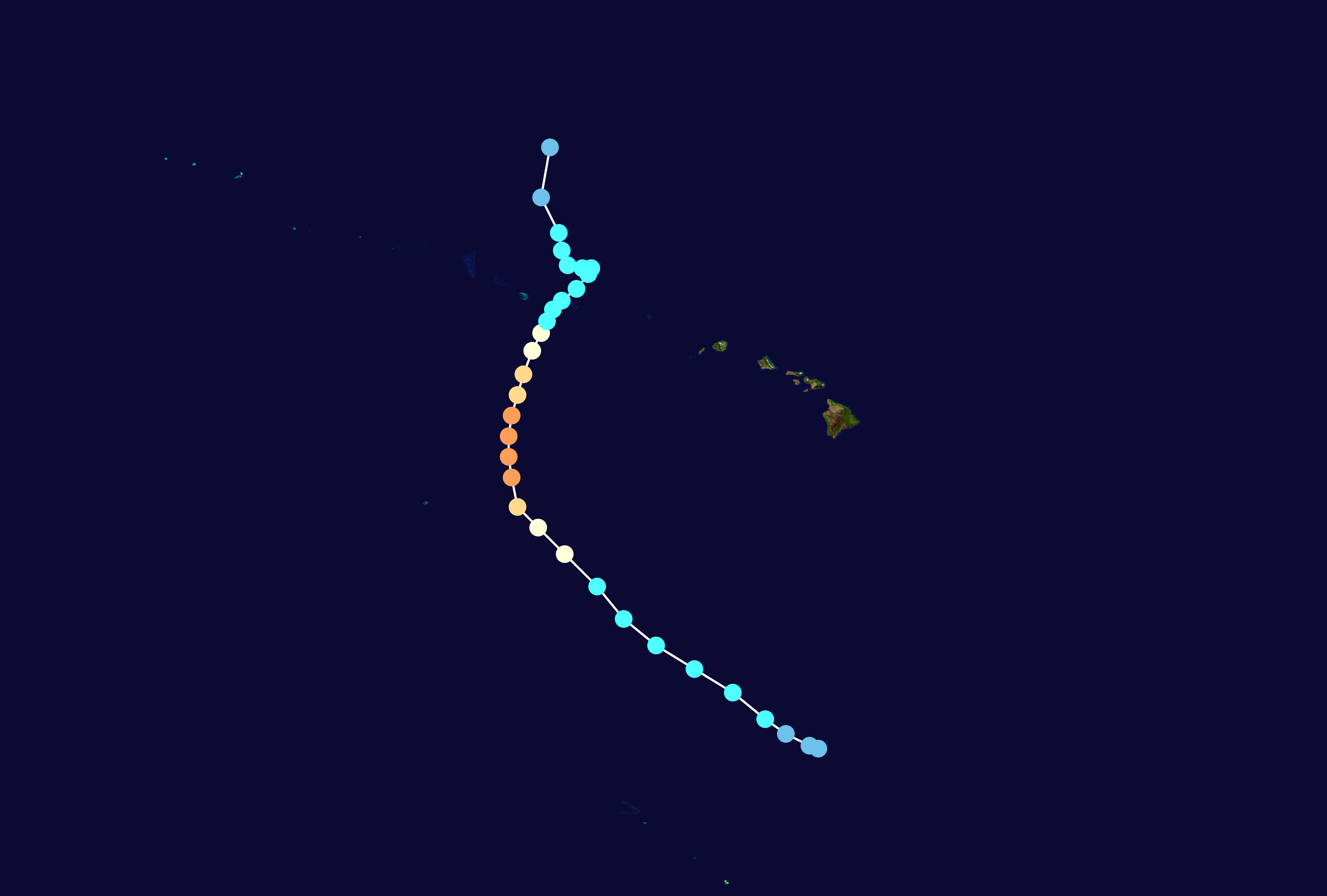
Map plotting the storm's track and intensity, according to the Saffir–Simpson scale Map key Saffir–Simpson scale Tropical depression (≤38 mph, ≤62 km/h) Tropical storm (39–73 mph, 63–118 km/h) Category 1 (74–95 mph, 119–153 km/h) Category 2 (96–110 mph, 154–177 km/h) Category 3 (111–129 mph, 178–208 km/h) Category 4 (130–156 mph, 209–251 km/h) Category 5 (≥157 mph, ≥252 km/h) Unknown Storm type Tropical cyclone Subtropical cyclone Extratropical cyclone, remnant low, tropical disturbance, or monsoon depression

The origins of Hurricane Neki were from a surface trough that persisted near the equator in the central Pacific Ocean in the middle of October 2009. A weak tropical disturbance became evident in the trough on October 15, and three days later the system began developing curved bands of convection on its northern and southern periphery. This created an unusually large gyre for the region. Following the formation of a well-defined circulation, it is estimated the system developed into Tropical Depression Three-C late on October 18, about 730 mi (1175 km) south of Ka Lae, Hawaii.

Upon developing into a tropical cyclone, the storm was moving west-northwestward, influenced by a ridge to its north. It was located over an area of warm sea surface temperatures and moderate wind shear, which favored gradual intensification. The convection diminished during a diurnal cycle before redeveloping the next day. Maintaining an unusually large size, the depression slowly organized, gradually separating from the trough from which it developed. On October 19, the CPHC upgraded it to Tropical Storm Neki, and shortly thereafter the storm turned toward the northwest. By the next day, the cyclone resembled the structure of a monsoon depression typically found in the western Pacific Ocean. However, the structure began to more resemble a tropical cyclone after the outermost convection diminished and the thunderstorms around the center increased. Following the development of a banding-eye feature, Neki intensified into a hurricane early on October 21 about 625 mi (1010 km) southwest of Honolulu, Hawaii, or about 335 mi (535 km) east-southeast of Johnston Atoll.

After reaching hurricane status, Neki began rapidly intensifying as it turned northward, due to an approaching upper-level trough to its north. An anticyclone aloft provided favorable outflow, which contributed in the strengthening. Early on October 22, Neki reached its peak winds of 125 mph (205 km/h) about 215 mi (345 km) northeast of Johnston Atoll, based on estimates from satellite imagery using the Dvorak technique. Afterward, the trough that influenced the hurricane's track also began restricting westerly outflow and increasing wind shear, which caused a steady weakening trend. It maintained major hurricane status – a Category 3 major hurricane on the Saffir–Simpson Hurricane Scale – for about 24 hours, during which the track turned toward the north-northeast. The weakening and deterioration of the storm's structure became more marked on October 23 after the thunderstorms failed to persist over the center.

While approaching the Papahānaumokuākea Marine National Monument, Neki weakened to tropical storm status. Continued wind shear exposed the circulation from the convection, although further weakening was slow to occur. On October 24, Neki made its closest approach to land after passing within 13 mi (21 km) of the uninhabited Necker Island. Its forward motion slowed due to a building ridge to the north, causing the storm to execute a small loop. Despite the shear, Neki was initially able to continue developing thunderstorms, although cooler water temperatures resulted in further weakening. The storm resumed its northward motion after the ridge receded to the east, and on October 26 Neki weakened to a tropical depression once the circulation decoupled from the thunderstorms. Neki dissipated on the next day, as the storm's center became elongated ahead of an approaching cold front.

== Preparations and impact ==
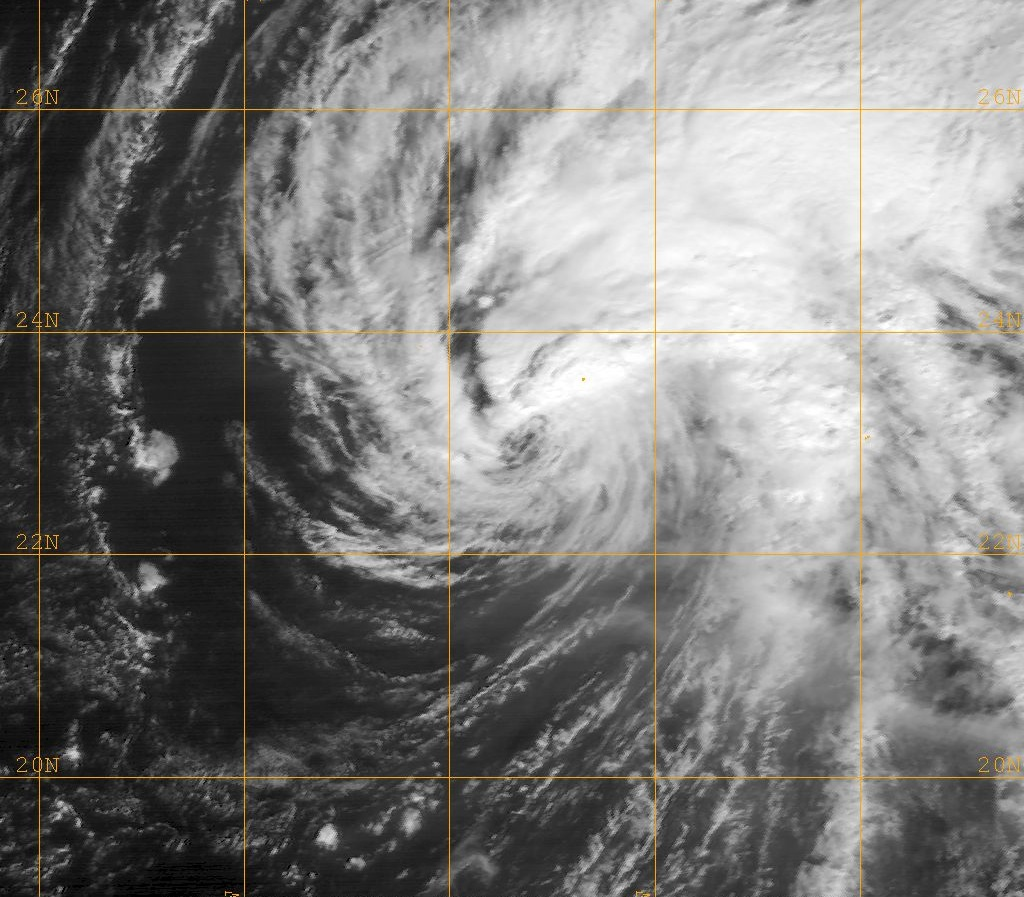
Tropical Storm Neki near the French Frigate Shoals on October 23

Although still a minimal tropical storm at the time, the CPHC anticipated Neki to become a hurricane as it tracked northwestward. As such, they issued a hurricane watch for Johnston Island on the afternoon of October 19. The following day, the hurricane watch was replaced by a tropical storm watch as Neki was no longer forecast to pass close enough to the island to produce hurricane-force winds. Later that day, a hurricane watch was issued for the Papahānaumokuākea Marine National Monument for areas between the French Frigate Shoals and Lisianski Island. The following morning, a supplementary hurricane warning was issued for the monument for areas between the French Frigate Shoals and Nīhoa. Additionally, the tropical storm watch for Johnston Island was discontinued. Early on October 22, the hurricane watch for Lisianski Island to Marco Reef was replaced by a tropical storm watch. Several hours later, the CPHC discontinued this watch. Early on October 23, as Neki weakened to a tropical storm, the hurricane warning for areas between the French Frigate Shoals and Nīhoa was replaced by a tropical storm warning. The tropical storm warning remained in effect for more than a day before being canceled during the afternoon of October 24.

As the hurricane turned northward and was seen as a threat to the Hawaiian Islands, officials in the Papahanaumokuakea requested that all 17 personnel in the region be evacuated. Several days before the storm passed through the islands, an AC-130 aircraft was flown to the area and evacuated the people stationed on Tern Island, while a National Oceanic and Atmospheric Administration vessel evacuated the temporary residents on Laysan Island. Hurricane Neki caused relatively little damage in the Papahanaumokuakea Marine National Monument. All of the structures were undamaged; however, two small natural habitat islands, Round and Disappearing Islands, were affected substantially. The former lost some land area and the latter was completely washed away. The storm damaged coral reefs in the region, which quickly regrew in the subsequent years. Neki did not affect the state of Hawaii, other than producing high clouds across the region.

== See also ==
- List of Category 3 Pacific hurricanes
- Hurricane Walaka - a strong hurricane in 2018 that took a similar path through the northwestern Hawaiian islands
