= List of named storms (S) =

Storms are named for historical reasons to avoid confusion when communicating with the public, as more than one storm can exist at a time. Names are drawn in order from predetermined lists. For tropical cyclones, names are assigned when a system has one-, three-, or ten-minute winds of more than 65 km/h (40 mph). Standards, however, vary from basin to basin. For example, some tropical depressions are named in the Western Pacific, while within the Australian and Southern Pacific regions, the naming of tropical cyclones are delayed until they have gale-force winds occurring more than halfway around the storm center.

This list covers the letter S.

== Storms ==
Note: † indicates the name was retired after that usage in the respective basin

- Saba (1983) – a weak tropical cyclone that remained very far at sea.
- Sadie (1994) – a weak, short-lived tropical cyclone that affected northern Australia.
- Sagar (2018) – a cyclonic storm that made landfall in Somalia.
- Saling

- 1965 – an intense, Category 5-equivalent super typhoon that affected the Ryukyu Islands, Taiwan and China.
- 1969 – a late-season storm which meandered in the Philippine Sea but dissipated before making landfall.
- 1977 – a fairly strong tropical storm that stayed at sea.
- 1981 – a short-lived tropical depression which was only monitored by PAGASA.
- 1985 – a powerful typhoon that affected the Philippines, Hainan and northern Vietnam, ultimately killing 90 people.
- 1988 – a relatively weak but destructive typhoon which caused widespread damage in the Philippines and Vietnam, claiming 101 lives.
- 1993 – a tropical storm that crossed the Philippines before brushing South China and making its final landfall in Vietnam.

- Sally

- 1954 – Category 5 super typhoon that impacted the Philippines.
- 1959 – a strong tropical storm affected Philippines.
- 1961 – a category 1 typhoon impact Taiwan and South China.
- 1964 – a Category 5 super typhoon that brought widespread impacts across the Northwest Pacific.
- 1967 – a category 2 typhoon impact Philippines.
- 1970 – did not make landfall.
- 1971 – a severe cyclone that made landfall in Australia.
- 1972 – a category 1 typhoon made landfall near the Surat Thani.
- 1976 – did not threaten land.
- 1986† – impacted the Cook Islands.
- 1996 – a Category 5 typhoon that made landfall in a similar location in the Philippines before going on to make landfall in China.
- 2005 – churned in the open ocean.
- 2020 – made landfall in Alabama as a Category 2 hurricane. A slow-moving storm that dropped heavy rain on multiple Gulf coast states; earliest eighteenth named storm on record.

- Salome

- 1950 – affected Hawaii; was designated from the Pacific typhoon naming lists by the Air Weather Service from Guam.
- 2017 – a weak tropical storm which caused minor impacts in the Philippines, South China, and Central Vietnam.
- 2025 – a tropical depression that affected Taiwan and Philippines.

- Sam

- 1977 – churned in the open ocean; renamed Cyclone Sam-Celimene when it crossed 90°E.
- 1999 – a severe tropical storm that impacted China.
- 2000† – a severe tropical cyclone that impacted Western Australia.
- 2021 – A large and long-lived Category 4 hurricane that churned in the open ocean.
- 2026 – a Mediterranean tropical-like cyclone while affecting Spain and Libya; also known as Cyclone Jolina.

- Samuel

- 2018 – a severe tropical storm that affected the Philippines and Vietnam.
- 2026 – a Category 2 typhoon that churned in the open ocean.

- Sanba

- 2012 – a Category 5 super typhoon that affected the Ryukyu Islands and the Korean Peninsula.
- 2018 – a tropical storm that affected a few minor Pacific islands.
- 2023 – a weak tropical storm that caused heavy rainfall.

- Sandra

- 1966 – a tropical cyclone that formed at sea southwest of Christmas Island.
- 1985 – a Category 3 hurricane that stayed in the open ocean.
- 2013 – a Category 3 severe tropical cyclone that caused minor effects on some South Pacific islands.
- 2015 – a Category 4 major hurricane, the strongest November Pacific hurricane on record.
- 2021 – a weak tropical storm that formed far out into sea.

- Sandy

- 1985† – a Category 4 severe tropical cyclone that affected Northern Australia.
- 2012† – an extremely large and destructive Category 3 Atlantic hurricane which ravaged the Caribbean and the coastal Mid-Atlantic region of the United States.

- Santi

- 2009 – a Category 2 typhoon that impacted Philippines and Vietnam.
- 2013† – a Category 3 typhoon that impacted Philippines and Vietnam, killing 93 people.

- Sanvu

- 2005 – a severe tropical storm that struck southern China.
- 2012 – a severe tropical storm that remained in open sea.
- 2017 – a Category 2 typhoon that remained in open sea.
- 2023 – remained in open sea.

- Saola

- 2005 – a Category 3 typhoon that remained at sea.
- 2012 – a Category 2 typhoon that affected Taiwan and East China, which also brought torrential rainfall in the Philippines.
- 2017 – a severe tropical storm that affected Japan.
- 2023† – a powerful category 5 typhoon passed close to Babuyan Islands, Southern China including Hong Kong.

- Saomai

- 2000 – a long-tracked Category 5 super typhoon that impacted southern Japan and the Korean Peninsula.
- 2006† – was considered as the strongest typhoon on record to strike East China.

- Sara (2024) – late-season tropical storm that made landfall in Belize, caused heavy rainfall and flooding in Honduras and Nicaragua.
- Sarah

- 1951 – remained in open waters.
- 1956 – A powerful Category 4 typhoon approached the Philippines Islands, it slowed down and then changed its direction and dissipated.
- 1959 – A powerful Category 5 typhoon among the deadliest typhoons on record in the western Pacific Ocean, killing around 2,000 people.
- 1962 – Category 1 typhoon that hit Japan.
- 1965 – a weak tropical storm that had little impact on Cambodia, Thailand and Malaysia.
- 1967 – A powerful Category 4 typhoon made landfall on Wake Island at peak intensity, causing widespread damage.
- 1971 – remained in open waters.
- 1973 – A powerful tropical storm has affected the Indochina peninsula.
- 1977 – A category 1 typhoon struck Philippines and China.
- 1979 – a long-living Category 3 typhoon that meandered in the South China Sea.
- 1983 – a weak tropical storm that caused significant damage to the Philippines.
- 1983 – impacted Fiji as a Category 4 severe tropical cyclone.
- 1986 – remained in open waters.
- 1989 – a powerful typhoon that caused extensive damage along an erratic path across the Western Pacific in September 1989.
- 1994 – a Category 4 severe tropical cyclone that affected Vanuatu and New Caledonia.
- 2010 – a weak tropical cyclone that affected a few South Pacific islands.
- 2019 – affected the northeastern portion of the Philippines.

- Sarai (2019)† – affected Niue and some Pacific islands.
- Sarika

- 2004 – a severe tropical storm that did not affect any land.
- 2011 – affected the Philippines as a tropical storm.
- 2016† – Made landfall in the Philippines as a category 4 typhoon.

- Saudel

- 2020 – a Category 1 typhoon that affected the Philippines, China and Vietnam.
- 2026 – a Category 4 typhoon that affected Japan, China, and Taiwan.

- Savannah (2019) – brought rainfall towards Java and Bali.
- Sean

- 2010 – an Australian late-season tropical cyclone that stayed out at sea.
- 2011 – a weak november tropical storm that stayed in the Atlantic Ocean.
- 2023 – a weak tropical storm that stayed at sea.
- 2025 – a Category 4 severe tropical cyclone that paralleled Western Australia.

- Sebastien

- 1995 – made landfall in Anguilla as a tropical depression.
- 2019 – rare late-season tropical storm that stayed out at sea.

- Selma

- 1970 – a strong tropical storm meandered to the north, turning to the northeast and northwest before heading southeastward and dissipating.
- 1974 – a Category 3 severe tropical cyclone predicted to impact Darwin, but instead, the system turned westward out to sea and eventually dissipated over open water.
- 1987 – did not make landfall.
- 2017 – minimal tropical storm that made landfall in El Salvador, causing minor damage.

- Selwyn

- 1986 – a Category 2 tropical cyclone that stayed off the coast of Western Australia.
- 1997 – a Category 3 severe tropical cyclone that stayed off the coast of Western Australia.

- Sendang

- 1991 – a long-lived typhoon which brushed Guam and Japan but only caused minimal damage.
- 1995 – a weak and poorly organized late-season tropical cyclone which claimed 14 lives in the Philippines.
- 1999 – another weak tropical system which was considered as a tropical storm by the Joint Typhoon Warning Center (JTWC) and PAGASA.

- Sendong (2011)† – a severe tropical storm that destructed southern Philippines, killing about 1,500 people.
- Seniang

- 1964 – struck the Philippines and China, killing 75 people.5
- 1968 – a Category 1 typhoon that made landfall Philippines.
- 1972 –
- 1976 – did not come near land.
- 1980 –
- 1984 –
- 1988 –
- 1992 – long-lived Category 5 super typhoon that affected the Marshall Islands and struck Guam.
- 1996 – struck Luzon and then made landfall in Vietnam.
- 2000 – struck the Philippines.
- 2006 – swept through the central Philippines in December 2006, exacerbating the damage left behind by previous Philippine typhoon strikes that year.
- 2014† – struck the Philippines, causing the deaths of 66 people and ₱1.27 billion in damages.

- Sening

- 1966 – a tropical depression which was only recognized by the Philippine Weather Bureau and the Joint Typhoon Warning Center (JTWC).
- 1970† – impacted that Philippines as a Category 5 super typhoon, making it the third strongest typhoon to strike the country; Sening killed more than 700 people.

- Senyar (2025) – a rare and very deadly tropical cyclone that brought heavy rains, caused catastrophic flooding and landslides to the Malay Peninsula and Sumatra.
- Sepat

- 2001 – a tropical storm that did not affect any land.
- 2007 – a Category 5 super typhoon that mainly affected China, which caused 43 deaths and around $700 million in damages.
- 2013 – a tropical storm that did not affect any land.
- 2019 – affected Japan and was recognised as a subtropical storm by the JTWC.
- 2025 – nearly passed Japan as a weakening tropical depression.

- Sergio

- 1978 – threatened Baja California.
- 1982 – never threatened land.
- 2006 – never threatened land.
- 2018 – a powerful and long-lived tropical cyclone that affected the Baja California Peninsula as a tropical storm and caused significant flooding throughout southern Texas in early October 2018.

- Seroja (2021)† – a deadly tropical cyclone that brought historic flooding and landslides to portions of southern Indonesia and East Timor and later went on to make landfall in Western Australia's Mid West region, becoming the first to do so since Cyclone Elaine in 1999.
- Seru (2025) – a Category 2 tropical cyclone that stayed out in sea.
- Seth

- 1991 – a powerful category 4 typhoon made landfall in the Philippines as a Tropical Storm.
- 1994 – a powerful category 4 typhoon that passed along the coast of China and hit South Korea.
- 2021† – a category 2 tropical cyclone that affected the northeastern states of Australia.

- Seymour

- 1992 – a Category 1 hurricane that stayed off the coast of Baja California.
- 2016 – a Category 4 hurricane that stayed out in sea.

- Shaheen (2021) – a Category 1 tropical cyclone was caused devastating effects mainly Oman, Iran, Saudi Arabia, and UAE.
- Shakhti (2025) – formed in the Arabian Sea and did not cause significant damage to land.
- Shanshan

- 2000 – a Category 4 typhoon but it was not a threat to land.
- 2006 – a Category 4 super typhoon that impacted Japan.
- 2013 – a weak February storm that brought rains to the Philippines, Vietnam and Malaysia.
- 2018 – a Category 2 typhoon that remained at sea.
- 2024 – a Category 4 typhoon that made landfall in Japan.

- Sharon

- 1971 – a November weak and short-lived tropical storm
- 1983 – a Category 2 tropical cyclone that remained in open waters.
- 1991 – a March severe tropical storm that affected some Pacific islands.
- 1993† – a Category 4 severe tropical cyclone that remained in open waters.
- 1994 – affected the Philippines and South China bringing torrential rainfall which caused billions of damages.

- Shary (2010) – a short-lived tropical cyclone that stayed over the open waters of the North Atlantic in late October 2010.
- Sheila

- 1971 – turned out to be the same system as Sophie, which made landfall over Western Australia as a Category 5 severe tropical cyclone.
- 2005 – a weak, short-lived tropical cyclone.

- Shirley

- 1952 – a weak tropical storm that made landfall Vietnam as tropical depression.
- 1957 – a Category 3 typhoon that minimal affected Northern Philippines.
- 1960 – a Category 4 typhoon that made landfall on southeastern China as a tropical storm.
- 1963 – a Category 5 typhoon that made landfall South Korea as tropical storm.
- 1965 – a Category 4 typhoon that made landfall Southern Japan.
- 1966 – a powerful tropical cyclone affected Western Australia caused only minor damage.
- 1968 – a Category 1 typhoon that made landfall Philippines and South China as tropical storm.
- 1971 – a Category 2 typhoon that did not affect any landmasses.
- 1974 – a minimal typhoon that made landfall Japan.
- 1975 – formed in open water, causing no damage or deaths.
- 1978 – a weak tropical storm that made landfall Vietnam.

- Sibyl

- 1992 – a Category 3 typhoon that did not affect any landmasses.
- 1995 – a strong severe tropical storm crossed the central Philippines and that made landfall South China as tropical storm

- Sid (1997) – a weak tropical cyclone that brought torrential rainfall and flooding over Northern Australia.
- Sidr (2007) – a Category 5 cyclone that resulted in one of the worst natural disasters in Bangladesh, with an estimation deaths of around 15,000.
- Sigma (1896) – a cyclone that struck Australia in 1896
- Sikat (2003) – a Category 2 typhoon that did not affect any landmasses.
- Simon

- 1980† – a severe tropical cyclone that impacted Queensland, and New Zealand as a post-tropical cyclone.
- 1984 – no known damage or casualties.
- 1990 – formed in open water, causing no damage or deaths.
- 2014 – Category 4 hurricane that dissipated before striking the Baja California Peninsula.
- 2026 – a small Category 4 hurricane that caused minor damage in Southwestern Mexico.

- Simone

- 1961 – a system which was later determined in a 2019 reanalysis to have not been a tropical cyclone.
- 1968 – made landfall in Guatemala.

- Sina

- 1980 – a Category 3 severe tropical cyclone that impacted New Caledonia and New Zealand.
- 1990† – impacted Fiji as a strong tropical cyclone, causing US$18.5 million in damages.

- Sinlaku

- 2002 – struck China
- 2008 – a Category 4 typhoon that struck Taiwan and approached Japan
- 2014 – a late-season tropical storm that struck the Philippines.
- 2020 – a weak tropical storm that affected southern China and northern Vietnam.
- 2026 – a Category 5 typhoon which became the second strongest typhoon to hit the Northern Mariana Islands.

- Siony

- 2004 – a Category 4 typhoon that struck Japan.
- 2008 – after PAGASA released the final advisory on "Quinta", PAGASA started to reissue advisories on Quinta, however Quinta was renamed as "Siony".
- 2020 – a severe tropical storm that affected northern Philippines.

- Sisang (1987)† – impacted the Philippines as a Category 5 super typhoon, killing 979 people in total.
- Sitrang (2022) – a tropical cyclone that affected India and Bangladesh on 25 October 2022. It was the first cyclone to hit Bangladesh since Cyclone Mora in 2017.
- Skip

- 1985 – a minimal typhoon that churned in the open ocean before crossing over into the Central Pacific basin as Tropical Storm Skip.
- 1988 – a Category 4 typhoon that killed over 200 people while crossing the Philippines; also known as Yoning within the Philippine Area of Responsibility.

- Solo (2015) – a tropical cyclone that affected Vanuatu.
- Son-Tinh

- 2012 – a Category 3 typhoon that impacted Vietnam.
- 2018 – a tropical storm that affected the Philippines and Vietnam.
- 2024 – a tropical storm that remained at sea.

- Sonamu

- 2000 – came close to Japan without making landfall.
- 2006 – a weak system that did not threat any land.
- 2013† – an early forming tropical storm that affected the Philippines.

- Sonca

- 2005 – an unusually early-season Category 4 typhoon.
- 2011 – a Category 2 typhoon that did not affect any land masses.
- 2017 – a weak tropical storm that affected Indochina.
- 2022 – a weak tropical storm impacted Vietnam.

- Songda

- 2004 – a Category 4 typhoon that struck Japan.
- 2011 – a May Category 5 super typhoon that approached Japan.
- 2016 – a Category 4 super typhoon that later approached Canada as a post–tropical storm.
- 2022 – brought heavy rains to parts of the Korea Peninsula.

- Sonia

- 1983 – a weak October tropical storm that never threatened land.
- 2013 – a weak tropical storm that made landfall in the Mexican state of Sinaloa, causing minor damage.
- 2025 – moderate tropical storm that stayed at sea.

- Sophie (1971) – which made landfall over Western Australia as a Category 5 severe tropical cyclone.
- Sose (2001)†– a tropical cyclone that affected Vanuatu.
- Soudelor

- 2003 – a Category 4 typhoon that affected the Philippines, Taiwan, Japan and South Korea
- 2009 – a weak tropical storm that affected Southern China
- 2015† – second-strongest storm of 2015, impacting eastern China as a Category 5 super typhoon.

- Soulik

- 2000 – a late-season Category 3 typhoon that spawned within two calendars.
- 2006 – affected the Marianas and Volcano Islands.
- 2013 – struck Taiwan and China as a Category 4 typhoon.
- 2018 – affected Japan as a Category 3 typhoon.
- 2024 – weak storm that made landfall in Vietnam.

- Sperry

- 1989 – a Category 1 typhoon that stayed at sea.
- 1983 – a tropical storm that did not approach land.
- 1987 – a Category 4 typhoon that did not affect any land masses.

- Stan

- 1979 – made landfall over the Cape York Peninsula twice.
- 2005† – a deadly Category 1 hurricane that impacted Mexico, killing about 1,600 people.
- 2016 – made landfall over Western Australia.

- Stella (1998) – a powerful tropical storm that reached the coast of Japan and caused serious damage.
- Steve

- 1977 – a Category 2 tropical cyclone passed off the coast of Fiji.
- 1990 – a Category 4 typhoon that did not affect any land masses.
- 1993 – a severe tropical storm that affected Taiwan.
- 2000† – a Category 2 tropical cyclone that mostly affected Northern Australia.

- Sudal (2004)† – strongest typhoon to strike the island of Yap in the Federated States of Micronesia in about 50 years.
- Sue (1975) – a weak tropical cyclone that stayed off the coast of southern Indonesia.
- Surigae

- 2021 – a Category 5 typhoon passed not far from the coast of the Philippines; was the strongest Northern Hemisphere tropical cyclone to form in the first four months of the calendar year.
- 2026 – a Category 4 typhoon that passed near the coast of Japan.

- Susan

- 1945
- 1953 – Category 3 typhoon that struck Taiwan
- 1958 – Category 3 typhoon
- 1961
- 1963 – Category 4-equivalent typhoon
- 1966
- 1969 – struck the Central Philippines
- 1972
- 1975
- 1978 – Category 4 hurricane that initially tracked toward Hawaii before sharply veering away.
- 1981
- 1984 – struck South Central Vietnam
- 1988 –
- 1997† – Category 5 tropical cyclone that affected Vanuatu, Fiji, and New Zealand; one of the most intense South Pacific tropical cyclones on record.

- Susang

- 1974 – brought heavy rainfall to Luzon, Hainan, and Vietnam with 26 dead and 3 missing; the name Bess was retired after this storm.
- 1978 – affected Palau, the Philippines, and Vietnam.
- 1982 – a Category 2-equivalent typhoon that made landfall on Japan, causing 26 fatalities with 8 missing.
- 1986 – affected the Philippines.
- 1990 – affected the Philippines.
- 1994 – a devastating and deadly Category 4 typhoon; Fred made landfall in China and affected Taiwan and Japan, causing 3,063 deaths and $1.19 billion in damages.

== See also ==
- European windstorm names
- Atlantic hurricane season
- List of Pacific hurricane seasons
- Tropical cyclone naming
- South Atlantic tropical cyclone
- Tropical cyclone
