= Sandra =

Sandra or SANDRA may refer to:

== People ==
- Sandra (given name)
- Sandra (singer) (born 1962), German pop singer
- Margaretha Sandra (1629–1674), Dutch soldier
- Sandra (orangutan), who won the legal right to be defined as a "non-human person"

== Places ==
- Șandra, a commune in Timiș County, Romania
- Şandra, a village in Beltiug Commune, Satu Mare County, Romania
- Sandra, Estonia, a village
- 1760 Sandra, an asteroid

== Other uses ==
- "Sandra" (song), a 1975 song by Barry Manilow
- "Sandra", song by Idle Eyes, 1986
- Sandra (1924 film), a lost drama film
- Sandra (1965 film), an Italian film
- SANDRA (research project), part of the European Union's Framework Programmes for Research and Technological Development
- Tropical Storm Sandra, several tropical cyclones
- Sandra (podcast), a scripted fiction podcast starring Kristen Wiig and Alia Shawkat

== See also ==
- Sandro (disambiguation)
- Sandara Park, a South Korean personality, actress, singer and model who rose to fame both in South Korea and in the Philippines
