= List of storms named Sarah =

The name Sarah, or Sara, has been used for 18 tropical cyclones worldwide: 1 in the Atlantic Ocean, 1 in the Central Pacific Ocean, 13 in the Western Pacific Ocean, and 3 in the South Pacific Ocean.

In the Atlantic:

- Tropical Storm Sara (2024) – A late-season tropical storm that made landfall in Belize caused heavy rainfall and severe flooding in Honduras and Nicaragua

In the Central Pacific:

- Hurricane Sarah (1967) – Category 2 hurricane; crossed the International Date Line

In the Western Pacific:

- Typhoon Sarah (1951)
- Typhoon Sarah (1956)
- Typhoon Sarah (1959) – Category 5-equivalent typhoon that devastated South Korea, killing at least 2,000 people; also known as the Miyakojima Typhoon
- Typhoon Sarah (1962)
- Tropical Storm Sarah (1965) (T6503, 03W)
- Tropical Storm Sarah (1971) (T7101, 01W)
- Tropical Storm Sarah (1973) (T7319, 21W)
- Typhoon Sarah (1977) (T7703, 05W, Elang)
- Typhoon Sarah (1979) (T7919, 22W, Sisang-Uring)
- Tropical Storm Sarah (1983) (T8301, 01W)
- Typhoon Sarah (1986) (T8610, 09W, Iliang)
- Typhoon Sarah (1989) (T8919, 22W, Openg)

The name Sarah was first used by PAGASA in 2019 after it replaced Sendong when it got retired in 2011.

- Tropical Storm Fung-wong (2019) (T1927, 28W, Sarah) – a short-lived storm that did not impact any landmasses

In the South Pacific:

- Cyclone Sarah (1983)
- Cyclone Sarah (1994)
- Cyclone Sarah (2010)

| Preceded by Ramon | Pacific typhoon season names Sarah | Succeeded by Tamaraw |

== See also ==
- Cyclone Sarai (2019), a similarly named tropical cyclone in the South Pacific.
