= List of storms named Sendang =

The name Sendang has been used for three tropical cyclones in the Philippines by PAGASA in the Western Pacific. Sendang is a nickname for a woman, and replaced Sisang after it was retired once the 1987 season concluded.

- Typhoon Orchid (1991) (T9121, 23W, Sendang) – a long-lived typhoon which brushed Guam and Japan but only caused minimal damage.
- Tropical Depression 32W/33W (1995) (32W/33W, Sendang) – a weak and poorly organized late-season tropical cyclone which claimed 14 lives in the Philippines.
- Tropical Depression Frankie (1999) (29W, Sendang) – another weak tropical system which was considered as a tropical storm by the Joint Typhoon Warning Center (JTWC) and PAGASA.
