= List of storms named Sibyl =

The name Sibyl was used for two tropical cyclones in the Northwestern Pacific Ocean:

- Typhoon Sibyl (1992) – a Category 3 typhoon that did not affect any landmasses.
- Tropical Storm Sibyl (1995) – a strong severe tropical storm crossed the central Philippines and that made landfall South China as tropical storm
