= List of storms named Sonia =

The name Sonia has been used for three tropical cyclones in the East Pacific Ocean:

- Tropical Storm Sonia (1983) – weak tropical storm that never threatened land
- Tropical Storm Sonia (2013) – weak tropical storm that made landfall in the Mexican state of Sinaloa, causing minor damage
- Tropical Storm Sonia (2025) – moderate tropical storm that stayed at sea
