= List of storms named Sean =

The name Sean has been used for four tropical cyclones worldwide, two in the Atlantic Ocean and two in the Australian Region of the Indian Ocean. In the Atlantic, the name replaced Stan, which was retired after the 2005 season.

In the Atlantic:

- Tropical Storm Sean (2011) – late-season tropical storm that affected Bermuda
- Tropical Storm Sean (2023) – weak tropical storm that stayed at sea

In the Australian region:

- Cyclone Sean (2010) – a Category 2 tropical cyclone that affected Western Australia
- Cyclone Sean (2025) – a strong Category 4 tropical cyclone that paralleled Western Australia
