= List of storms named Steve =

The name Steve has been used for four tropical cyclones worldwide, two in the Western Pacific Ocean, one in the Australian Region and one in the South Pacific Ocean.

In the Western Pacific:

- Typhoon Steve (1990) – a Category 4 typhoon that did not affect any land masses.
- Tropical Storm Steve (1993) – a severe tropical storm that affected Taiwan.

In the Australian Region:

- Cyclone Steve (2000) – a Category 2 tropical cyclone that mostly affected Northern Australia.

In the South Pacific Ocean:

- Cyclone Steve (1977) – a Category 2 tropical cyclone passed off the coast of Fiji
