= List of storms named Sandra =

The name Sandra has been used for five tropical cyclones worldwide, three in the Eastern Pacific Ocean, one in the Australian Region and one in the South Pacific.

In the Eastern Pacific:

- Hurricane Sandra (1985), a high-end Category 3 hurricane that stayed in the open ocean
- Hurricane Sandra (2015), a strong late-season Category 4 hurricane that dissipated just offshore from Sinaloa
- Tropical Storm Sandra (2021), a weak system that formed far out to sea

In the Australian Region:

- Cyclone Sandra (1966), formed southwest of Christmas Island

In the South Pacific:

- Cyclone Sandra (2013), formed off the Queensland coast, its remnants bought heavy rains to parts of New Zealand

== See also ==
- List of storms named Sandy, similar name used in the Atlantic and Australian region tropical cyclone basins
