= List of storms named Simon =

The name Simon has been used for four tropical cyclones in the Eastern Pacific Ocean and for one in the Australian region.

In the Eastern Pacific:

- Tropical Storm Simon (1984) – moderate tropical storm that churned in the open ocean
- Tropical Storm Simon (1990) – strong tropical storm that stayed at sea
- Hurricane Simon (2014) – Category 4 hurricane that made landfall on the Baja California Peninsula as a remnant low
- Hurricane Simon (2026) – a small but intense Category 4 hurricane that caused minor damage in Southwestern Mexico.

In the Australian region:

- Cyclone Simon (1980) – a Category 3 tropical cyclone that struck Queensland
