= List of storms named Selwyn =

The name Selwyn has been used for two tropical cyclones in the Australian region.

- Cyclone Selwyn (1986) – a Category 2 tropical cyclone that remained far from land.
- Cyclone Selwyn (1997) – a Category 3 tropical cyclone that also remained at sea.
