= List of storms named Sperry =

The name Sperry was used for three tropical cyclones in the Northwestern Pacific Ocean:

- Typhoon Sperry (1980) (T8016, 20W) – a Category 1 typhoon, did not make landfall.
- Tropical Storm Sperry (1983) (T8322, 23W, Barang) – a tropical storm that did not approach land.
- Typhoon Sperry (1987) (T8704, 04W, Bebeng) – a Category 1 typhoon, did not make landfall.
