= List of storms named Seth =

The name Seth has been used for three tropical cyclones worldwide, two in the Western Pacific ocean and one in the Australian Region.

in Western Pacific:

- Typhoon Seth (1991) (T9127, 26W, Warling) – a powerful category 4 typhoon made landfall in the Philippines as a Tropical Storm.
- Typhoon Seth (1994) (T9429, 32W, Bidang) – a powerful category 4 typhoon that passed along the coast of China and hit South Korea.

Australian region:

- Cyclone Seth (2021) – a category 2 tropical cyclone (Australian scale) that affected the northeastern states of Australia.

After the 2021-22 season, the name Seth was removed from the Australian name list.
