= List of storms named Seymour =

The name Seymour has been used for two tropical cyclones in the Eastern Pacific Ocean.

- Hurricane Seymour (1992) – a Category 1 hurricane that stayed off the coast of Baja California.
- Hurricane Seymour (2016) – a Category 4 hurricane that stayed out at sea.
