= List of storms named Sina =

The name Sina has been used for two tropical cyclones in the South Pacific region of the Southern Hemisphere:

- Cyclone Sina (1980) – a Category 3 severe tropical cyclone that impacted New Caledonia and New Zealand.
- Cyclone Sina (1990) – impacted Fiji as a strong tropical cyclone, causing US$18.5 million in damages.

The WMO retired the name Sina from use in the South Pacific basin following the 1990–91 cyclone season.
