= List of storms named Sandy =

The name Sandy has been used for two tropical cyclones worldwide, one in the Atlantic ocean and one in the Australian Region.

In the Atlantic:

- Hurricane Sandy (2012) – a Category 3 major hurricane that inflicted nearly $70 billion (2012 USD) in damage and killed 233 people across eight countries from the Caribbean to Canada.

The name was retired in the Atlantic after the 2012 hurricane season and was replaced with Sara.

Australian region:

- Cyclone Sandy (1985) – a severe tropical cyclone that affected Northern Australia.

The name was retired in Australian region after the 1984–85 cyclone season.
