= Hurricane Sandra (2015) =

Category 4 Pacific hurricane in 2015

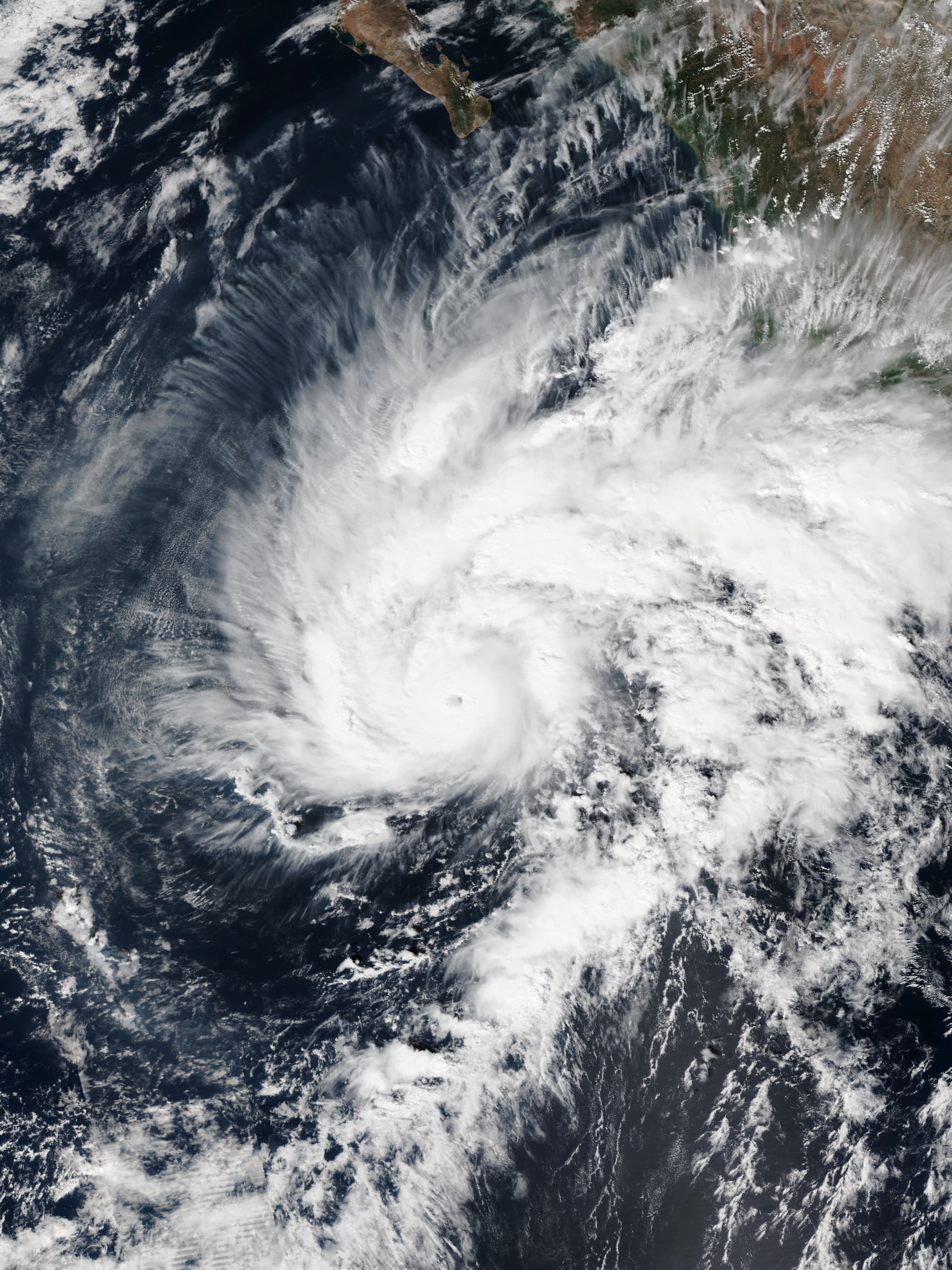
- Hurricane Sandra near peak intensity southwest of Mexico on November 25

Meteorological history
- Formed: November 23, 2015
- Remnant low: November 28, 2015
- Dissipated: November 29, 2015

Category 4 major hurricane
- 1-minute sustained (SSHWS/NWS)
- Highest winds: 150 mph (240 km/h)
- Lowest pressure: 934 mbar (hPa); 27.58 inHg

Overall effects
- Fatalities: 4 total
- Damage: Minimal
- Areas affected: Central America, Western and Northwestern Mexico
- IBTrACS /
- Part of the 2015 Pacific hurricane season

Hurricane Sandra was the latest-forming major hurricane in the northeastern Pacific basin, (Note: The Northeastern Pacific basin covers the Pacific Ocean north of the equator from 140°W east to North and Central America.) the strongest Pacific hurricane on record in November, and the record-tying eleventh major hurricane of the 2015 Pacific hurricane season. Originating from a tropical wave, Sandra was first classified as a tropical depression on November 23 well south of Mexico. Environmental conditions, including high sea surface temperatures and low wind shear, were highly conducive to intensification and the storm quickly organized. A small central dense overcast developed atop the storm and Sandra reached hurricane status early on November 25 after the consolidation of an eye. Sandra reached its peak intensity as a Category 4 hurricane on the Saffir–Simpson hurricane wind scale with winds of 150 mph (240 km/h) and a pressure of 934 mbar (hPa; 27.58 inHg) early on November 26. Thereafter, increasing shear degraded the hurricane's structure and weakening ensued. Rapid weakening took place on November 27 and Sandra's circulation became devoid of convection as it diminished to a tropical storm that evening. The cyclone degenerated into a remnant low soon thereafter and ultimately dissipated just off the coast of Sinaloa, Mexico, on November 29.

As the precursor to Sandra traversed Central America, it produced unseasonably heavy rainfall that triggered flooding and landslides. Four people died in various incidents related to the system: three in El Salvador and one in Honduras. Initially expecting a landfalling storm, officials in Northwestern Mexico prepared equipment for power outages, closed schools, and evacuated 180 residents. Sandra's effects largely consisted of light to moderate rainfall; some traffic accidents and landslides resulted from this, though the overall impacts were limited.

== Meteorological history ==
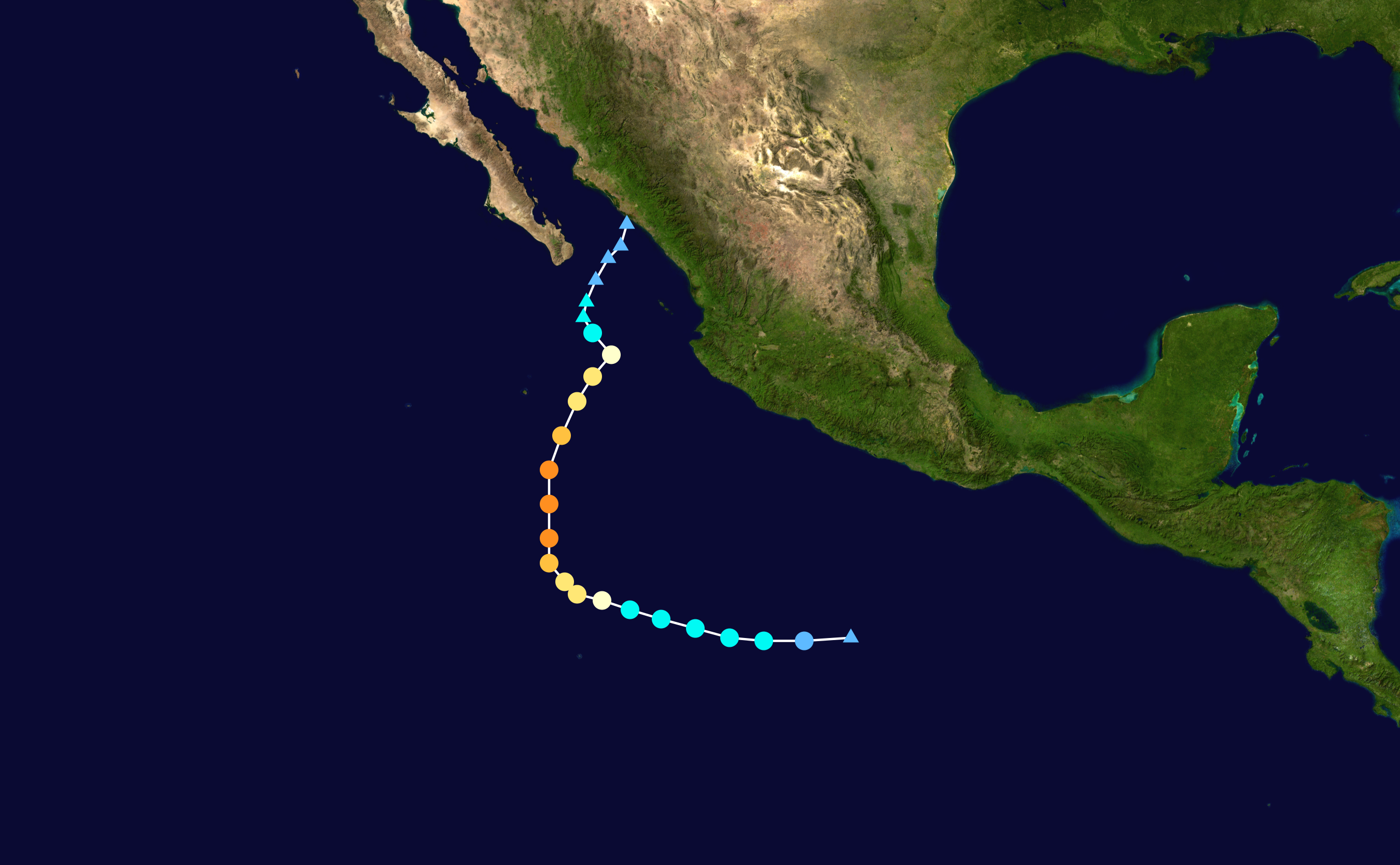
Map plotting the storm's track and intensity, according to the Saffir–Simpson scale Map key Saffir–Simpson scale Tropical depression (≤38 mph, ≤62 km/h) Tropical storm (39–73 mph, 63–118 km/h) Category 1 (74–95 mph, 119–153 km/h) Category 2 (96–110 mph, 154–177 km/h) Category 3 (111–129 mph, 178–208 km/h) Category 4 (130–156 mph, 209–251 km/h) Category 5 (≥157 mph, ≥252 km/h) Unknown Storm type Tropical cyclone Subtropical cyclone Extratropical cyclone, remnant low, tropical disturbance, or monsoon depression

On November 6, 2015, a tropical wave emerged off the west coast of Africa into the Atlantic Ocean. Only sporadic convection—shower and thunderstorm activity—accompanied the system as it traveled west for the next ten days. As it reached the southwestern Caribbean on November 17, westerly winds associated with the Intertropical Convergence Zone spurred the development of an area of low pressure and extensive convection. Forecasters at the National Hurricane Center (NHC) noted potential for the system to develop into a tropical cyclone; however, persistent wind shear inhibited this system from consolidating before it reached Central America. The system emerged over the Pacific Ocean near Nicaragua on November 21; once back over water, convection blossomed near the low's center. Convection remained largely disorganized over the following two days as the system progressed westward in response to a subtropical ridge to the north.

A Tehuantepec gap wind event in conjunction with horizontal wind shear spurred development of a vortex within the disturbance and a well-defined low formed by 12:00 UTC on November 23. Six hours later the low acquired sufficient convective organization, including elongated banding features to the north, to be classified Tropical Depression Twenty-Two-E. At this time, the depression was situated 435 mi (705 km) south-southwest of Acapulco, Mexico. Aided by high sea surface temperatures of 86 °F (30 °C), ample ocean heat content and low wind shear, the small system quickly intensified into a tropical storm—at which time the NHC assigned it the name Sandra—and developed a central dense overcast. A prominent banding feature with cloud tops below −112 °F (−80 °C) and frequent lightning formed north of the circulation on November 24. By 18:00 UTC, a 23 to 29 mi (37 to 47 km) wide eye became apparent, signaling the onset of rapid intensification.

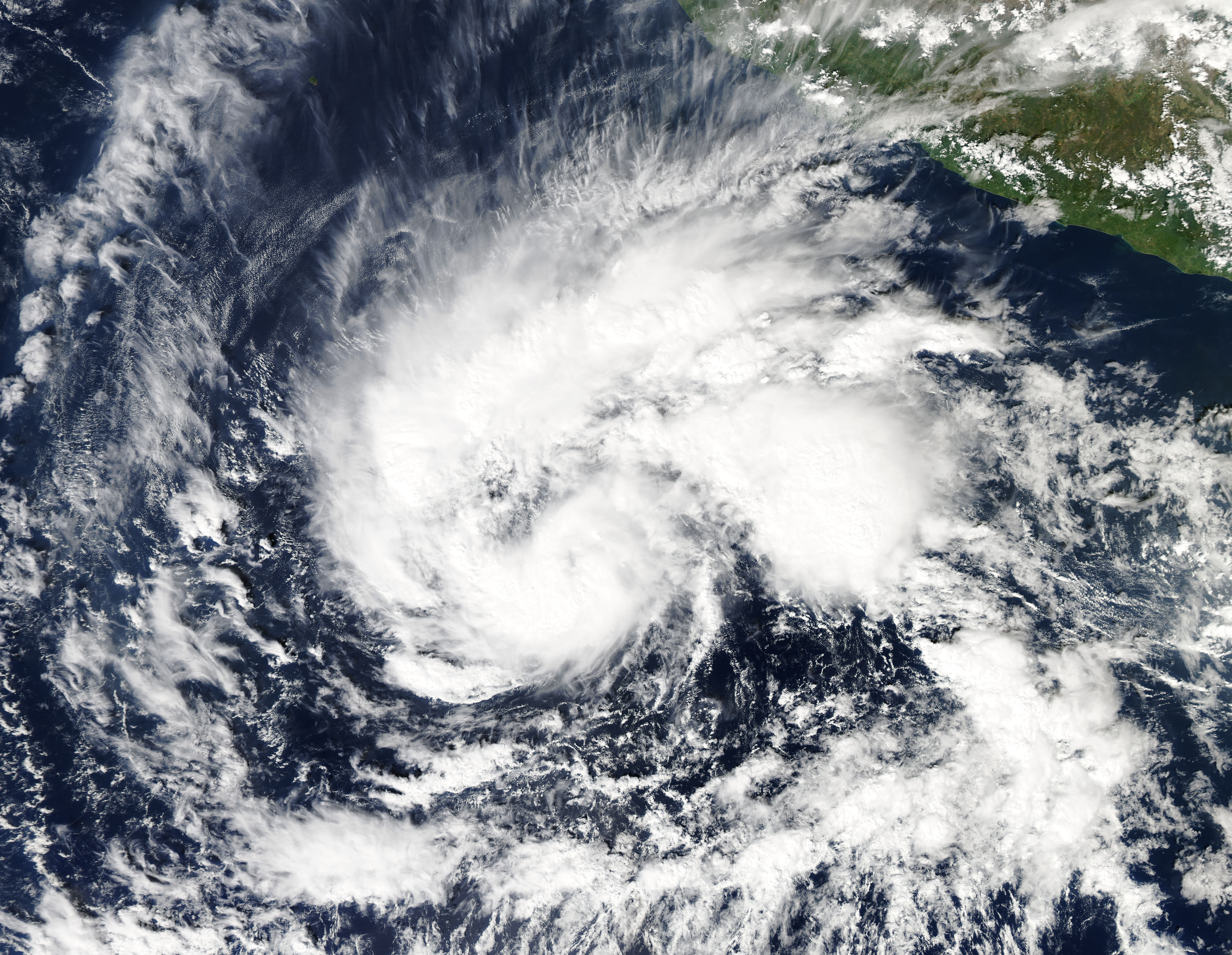
An intensifying Tropical Storm Sandra on November 24

Throughout November 25, Sandra dramatically strengthened as deep convection blossomed around a tightening and clearing eye. The system achieved hurricane status by 06:00 UTC and major hurricane status—Category 3 or higher on the Saffir–Simpson hurricane wind scale—by 00:00 UTC on November 26. Prominent outflow became established atop the cyclone and further aided the intensification. Throughout the strengthening phase, a mid- to upper-level trough near the west coast of North America created a weakness in the subtropical ridge, prompting Sandra to turn north around the western edge of the high. Sandra reached its peak intensity as a high-end Category 4 hurricane around 06:00 UTC on November 26 with maximum sustained winds of 150 mph (240 km/h) and a barometric pressure of 934 mbar (hPa; 27.58 inHg). By this time, the hurricane's eye shrunk to less than 6 mi (10 km) in diameter. Within hours, however, increasing wind shear began to impact the circulation and caused convection to become asymmetric. Concurrently, the system started a turn northeast toward mainland Mexico as it rounded the ridge.

Steadily increasing wind shear gradually unraveled Sandra during the latter part of November 26 and into November 27. The storm's outflow, though prominent to the north, became restricted on the southern side. Sandra briefly regained organization around 00:00 UTC on November 27, with its eye becoming redefined; however, persistent shear prevailed and the system weakened below major hurricane status by 06:00 UTC. The hurricane rapidly deteriorated throughout November 27 as convection became displaced to the northeast of the circulation. The low-level circulation soon decoupled from the mid- to upper-level circulations and Sandra degraded to a tropical storm by 00:00 UTC on November 28. The convectively devoid low-level circulation abruptly turned northwest in response to a shallow ridge. Failing to redevelop convection atop its center, Sandra degenerated into a remnant low by 06:00 UTC. Sustained winds dropped below gale-force by 18:00 UTC. Intense thunderstorm activity did blossom to the northeast of the center late on November 28, prompting the storm to resume a northeasterly course. Sandra's remnants eventually succumbed to strong shear and opened up into a trough, roughly 60 mi (95 km) southwest of Culiacán, Mexico, late on November 29.

=== Records ===
Reaching tropical storm status on November 24, Sandra was the fourth-latest forming tropical storm in the Northeastern Pacific basin since reliable records began. Upon becoming a hurricane at 06:00 UTC on November 25, Sandra was the second-latest such storm on record in the Northeastern Pacific; only Hurricane Winnie of 1983—the only December hurricane on record in the basin—formed later. This also marked the record-tying 16th hurricane to form in the Pacific north of the equator and east of the International Date Line; this record is shared with 1990, 1992, and 2014. When it further became a major hurricane at 00:00 UTC on November 26, Sandra was the latest-forming such storm in the Northeastern Pacific basin on record. It surpassed the previous record set by Hurricane Kenneth in 2011 by nearly four days. Sandra was also the ninth major hurricane in the Northeastern Pacific proper and the eleventh east of the dateline, both setting a record for the most in a single season. Sandra's peak intensity with winds of 150 mph (240 km/h) and pressure of 934 mbar (hPa; 27.58 inHg) ranked it as the strongest November hurricane on record in the Northeastern Pacific, surpassing Hurricane Kenneth's 145 mph (230 km/h) and 940 mbar (hPa; 27.76 inHg). On a global scale, Sandra was the 30th major hurricane and "record-shattering" 25th Category 4 or 5 storm of 2015; the previous records were 23 and 18, respectively, occurring in both 1997 and 2004.

== Preparations and impact ==
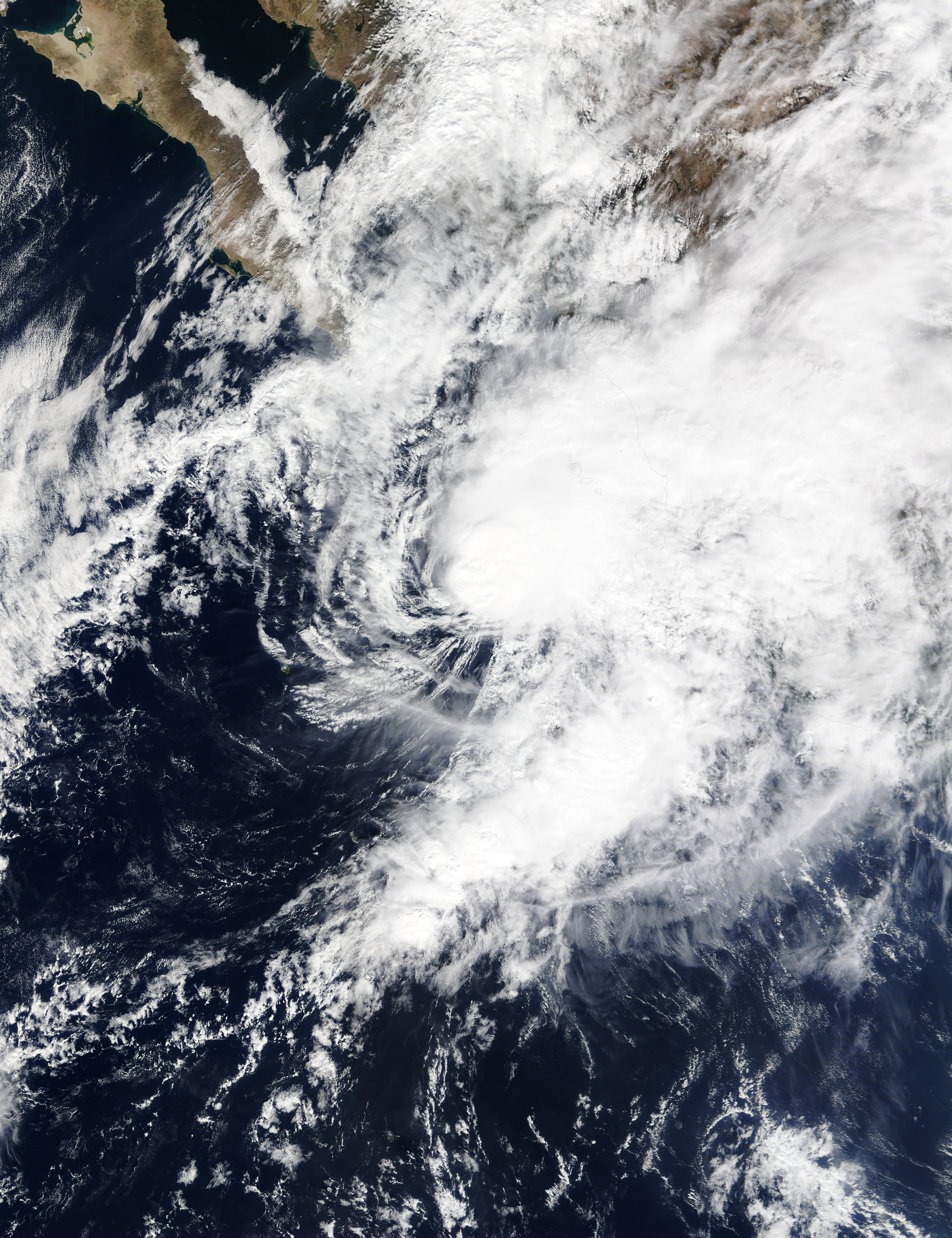
Hurricane Sandra succumbing to strong wind shear on November 27. Note part of the low-level circulation exposed on the west side of the central dense overcast

The precursor to Sandra produced unseasonably heavy rains across parts of Central America, leading to flooding. In Nicaragua, flooding affected 55 homes and destroyed 1, primarily in Managua. A total of 56 families required evacuation. Local officials blamed the flooding on trash-clogged drains. Five people were injured in the Nueva Segovia Department when an ambulance crashed on a foggy, rain-slicked road. A landslide in Cucuyagua, Honduras, destroyed a home killing a 25-day-old baby and injuring four others. In Nueva Esparta, El Salvador, two people drowned after being swept away by the swollen El Amatal River. Flooding in Ozatlán killed one person and inundated homes in Jiquilisco, prompting the evacuation of 14 families.

Moisture from Sandra streamed northward into the Southern Plains and Lower Mississippi River Valley and contributed to widespread rainfall and flooding. Heavy rains affected portions of Texas, Oklahoma, Arkansas, Mississippi, and Tennessee. The Dallas–Fort Worth metroplex received 3.45 in (88 mm) of rain on November 27, their wettest November day on record; this total contributed to breaking the city's wettest-year on record.

=== Mexico ===
On November 26, the Government of Mexico issued a tropical storm watch for Baja California Sur between Todos los Santos and Los Barriles; this was discontinued less than 24 hours later. The State Council of Civil Protection of Baja California Sur opened four shelters in both Cabo San Lucas and San José del Cabo; school officials cancelled classes for November 27. In La Paz, the Federal Electricity Commission deployed 96 trucks to handle potential power outages. On November 27, a tropical storm warning was raised for mainland Mexico between Altata and San Blas as well as the Islas Marías; the warning was discontinued the following day as Sandra rapidly dissipated. Alerts were raised across portions of Sinaloa and Nayarit in advance of the hurricane. The port of Mazatlán suspended operations on November 28 and public shelters were opened in the city. Water pumps, generators, and relief crews were mobilized at the port. About 180 people from the small community of Boca Camichin, Nayarit, evacuated inland. The storm also prompted delay of the annual Maratón Pacífico.

On November 27, Sandra produced wind gusts up to 40 mph (65 km/h) on Socorro Island as the storm moved 115 mi (185 km) southeast of the island. Effects from Sandra were minor and limited due to its dissipation offshore; rainfall was limited to 1 to 3 in (25 to 76 mm) in most areas and largely considered beneficial. In contrast to predictions of 75 to 150 mm (3.0 to 5.9 in) of rain across Baja California Sur, only 18 mm (0.71 in) fell in San José del Cabo while other areas of the Los Cabos Municipality received a trace to no accumulation. Wet roads in Cabo San Lucas resulted in two accidents that left three people injured. In Chihuahua, minor landslides damaged roads.

== See also ==
- Other storms of the same name
- Weather of 2015
- Tropical cyclones in 2015
- List of Category 4 Pacific hurricanes
- Timeline of the 2015 Pacific hurricane season
