= List of storms named Shirley =

The name Shirley has been used to name nine tropical cyclones in the western Pacific Ocean and one tropical cyclone in the Australian basin.

In the Western Pacific Ocean:

- Tropical Storm Shirley (1952)
- Typhoon Shirley (1957)
- Typhoon Shirley (1960)
- Typhoon Shirley (1963)
- Super Typhoon Shirley (1965)
- Typhoon Shirley (1968)
- Typhoon Shirley (1971)
- Typhoon Shirley (1974)
- Tropical Storm Shirley (1978)

In the Australian region:

- Cyclone Shirley (1966)
- Cyclone Shirley (1975)
