= List of storms named Saola =

The name Saola (Vietnamese: sao la, [saːw˧˧ laː˧˧]) has been used for four tropical cyclones in the western North Pacific Ocean. The name was contributed by Vietnam and refers to the saola, a rarely observed bovine species first found in Vietnam.

- Typhoon Saola (2005) (T0517, 18W) – category 3 typhoon that steered away from Japan.
- Typhoon Saola (2012) (T1209, 10W, Gener) – a costly typhoon that affected the Philippines, Taiwan, and China.
- Severe Tropical Storm Saola (2017) (T1722, 27W, Quedan) – category 1 typhoon that passed closely near Japan.
- Typhoon Saola (2023) (T2309, 09W, Goring) – category 5 typhoon that passed close to Babuyan Islands, southern China, and Hong Kong.

The name Saola was retired following the 2023 Pacific typhoon season and was replaced with Saobien (Vietnamese: sao biển, [saːw˧˧ ʔɓiən˧˩]), which means starfish in Vietnamese.
