= List of storms named Sheila =

The name Sheila has been used for one tropical cyclones in the Australian region, and one in the South Pacific Ocean.

In the Australian Region:

- Cyclone Sheila-Sophie (1971) – turned out to be the same system as Sophie, which made landfall over Western Australia as a Category 5 severe tropical cyclone.

In the South Pacific Ocean:

- Cyclone Sheila (2005) – a weak, short-lived tropical cyclone
