= List of storms named Simone =

The name Simone has been used for two tropical cyclones in the Eastern Pacific Ocean.

- Tropical Storm Simone (1961), a system which was later determined in a 2019 reanalysis to have not been a tropical cyclone.
- Tropical Storm Simone (1968), made landfall in Guatemala.

== See also ==
- St Jude storm (2013), was named Simone in Sweden.
