= List of storms named Sebastien =

The name Sebastien has been used for two tropical cyclones in the Atlantic Ocean.

- Tropical Storm Sebastien (1995), made landfall in Anguilla as a tropical depression.
- Tropical Storm Sebastien (2019), late-season tropical storm that stayed out at sea.
