= List of storms named Sharon =

The name Sharon has been used for five tropical cyclones worldwide.

Eastern Pacific:

- Tropical Storm Sharon (1971)

Western Pacific:

- Tropical Storm Sharon (1991) (T9101, 01W, Auring)
- Tropical Storm Sharon (1994) (T9404, 06W, Gading)

Australian Region:

- Cyclone Sharon (1983)
- Cyclone Sharon (1993)

== See also ==
- Hurricane Shary, a similar name which has been used in the Atlantic Ocean.
