= List of storms named Skip =

The name Skip was used for two tropical cyclones in the Northwestern Pacific Ocean.

- Typhoon Skip (1985) – a minimal typhoon that churned in the open ocean; also known as Tropical Storm Skip in the Central Pacific basin
- Typhoon Skip (1988) (T8829, 51W, Yoning) – a destructive Category 4-equivalent typhoon that killed at least 230 people while crossing the Philippines
