= List of storms named Stan =

The name Stan has been used for three tropical cyclones worldwide, one in the North Atlantic Ocean and twice in the Australian Region of the South Pacific Ocean. After 2005, the name Stan was retired from use in the Atlantic, and was replaced by Sean.

In the Atlantic:

- Hurricane Stan (2005), a deadly Category 1 hurricane that affected areas of Central America and Mexico

In the Australian Region:

- Cyclone Stan (1979), made landfall over the Cape York Peninsula twice.
- Cyclone Stan (2016), made landfall over Western Australia.
