= Tropical Storm Sibyl (1995) =

Pacific severe tropical storm in 1995

Severe Tropical Storm Sibyl (Mameng)
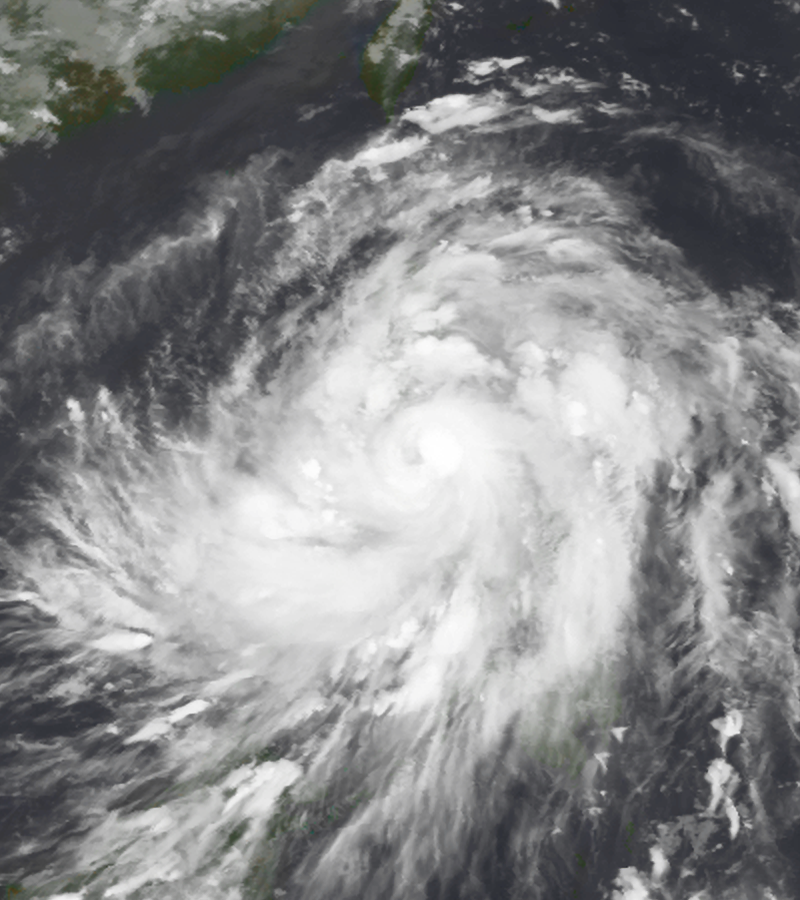
- Severe Tropical Storm Sibyl on September 30

Meteorological history
- Formed: September 27, 1995
- Dissipated: October 4, 1995

Severe tropical storm
- 10-minute sustained (JMA)
- Highest winds: 95 km/h (60 mph)
- Lowest pressure: 985 hPa (mbar); 29.09 inHg

Category 2-equivalent typhoon
- 1-minute sustained (SSHWS/JTWC)
- Highest winds: 175 km/h (110 mph)
- Lowest pressure: 949 hPa (mbar); 28.02 inHg

Overall effects
- Fatalities: 124-192
- Injuries: 93
- Missing: 126
- Damage: $279 million (1995 USD)
- Areas affected: Philippines; Hong Kong; South China
- Part of the 1995 Pacific typhoon season

Severe Tropical Storm Sibyl, known as Severe Tropical Storm Mameng in the Philippines, was a strong and destructive tropical cyclone that affected the Philippines, China, Hong Kong, and Macau. The 20th tropical depression and 16th named storm of the 1995 Pacific typhoon season. Sibyl originated as a tropical disturbance east of the Marshall Islands on September 21. Sibyl was upgraded to a tropical storm on September 28 before making its first landfall in Samar on September 29. The JMA upgraded Sibyl to a severe tropical storm at 00:00 UTC on September 30. That same day at 12:00 UTC, Sibyl reached typhoon intensity, peaking 24 hours later on September 30, according to the JTWC. On October 1, the JMA reported that Sibyl attained a minimum pressure of 985 hPa (29.1 inHg). The JMA downgraded Sibyl to a tropical storm at 06:00 UTC on October 3. In total, Sibyl made four landfalls in the Philippines and eventually dissipated on October 4 in southern China.

In the Philippines alone, 116 people were killed, with almost half due to mudflows in Pampanga province. Total damage was estimated at $120 million (₱3.1 billion). At least 1,240,668 people were affected by the storm and 234,000 people were left homeless. A total of 13,234 homes were damaged, and 21,862 homes were partially damaged. In China, 30 people were reported injured, with eight people killed in Guangdong province. Sibyl destroyed over 180,000 ha (440,000 acres) of farmland. Damage in China was estimated at $159 million (1.32 billion RMB). In Hong Kong, 14 people were injured. In Macau, no injuries and deaths were reported.

== Meteorological history ==
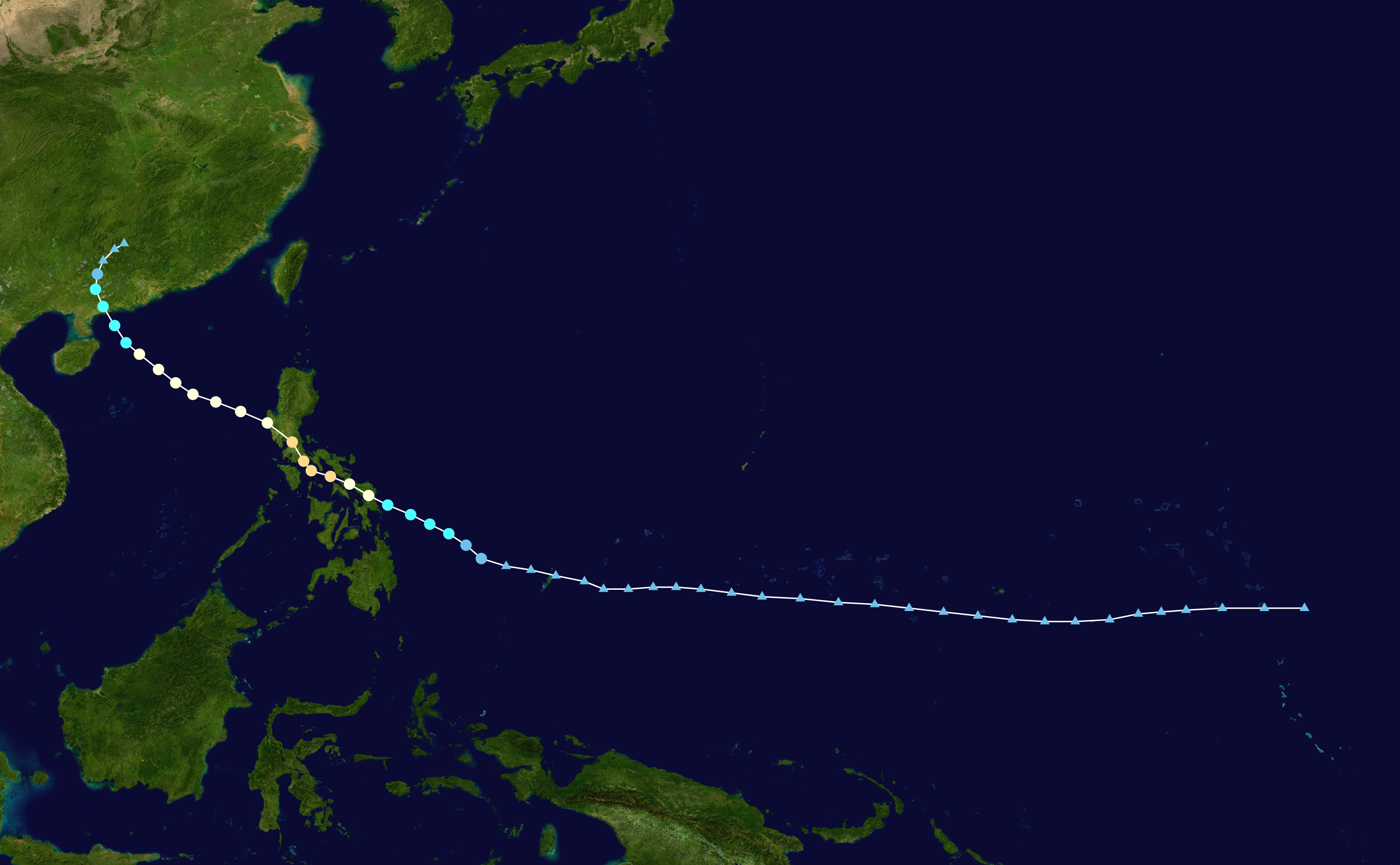
Map plotting the storm's track and intensity, according to the Saffir–Simpson scale Map key Saffir–Simpson scale Tropical depression (≤38 mph, ≤62 km/h) Tropical storm (39–73 mph, 63–118 km/h) Category 1 (74–95 mph, 119–153 km/h) Category 2 (96–110 mph, 154–177 km/h) Category 3 (111–129 mph, 178–208 km/h) Category 4 (130–156 mph, 209–251 km/h) Category 5 (≥157 mph, ≥252 km/h) Unknown Storm type Tropical cyclone Subtropical cyclone Extratropical cyclone, remnant low, tropical disturbance, or monsoon depression

On September 21 at 06:00 UTC, the Joint Typhoon Warning Center (JTWC) first monitored a tropical disturbance east of the Marshall Islands. The tropical disturbance began moving westward, developing slowly as it progressed. The tropical disturbance was first mentioned in the Significant Tropical Weather Advisory on September 23 at 06:00 UTC and the JTWC first issued a Tropical Cyclone Formation Alert (TCFA) at 00:00 UTC on September 25. At 06:00 UTC on September 27, the Japan Meteorological Agency (JMA) began monitoring the system as a tropical depression. Once the storm crossed the Philippine Area of Responsibility (PAR) on September 27, the Philippine Atmospheric, Geophysical and Astronomical Services Administration (PAGASA) assigned it the local name Mameng. At 00:00 UTC on September 28, as Sibyl turned to the west-northwest, the JTWC issued the first warning on Tropical Depression 20W. Both the JMA and JTWC upgraded it to a tropical storm on the same day at 12:00 UTC.

At 12:00 UTC on September 29, the JTWC upgraded Sibyl to a typhoon, and the storm made its first landfall in Samar. Low-level cyclonic winds accelerated through channels between islands, increasing low-level convergence and convection. Upper-level flow patterns were favorable for intensification, allowing the storm to strengthen while passing through the archipelago due to the contraction of the wind field. At 18:00 UTC on the same day, Sibyl made its second landfall on Burias Island. Six hours later, at 00:00 UTC on September 30, the JMA upgraded Sibyl to a severe tropical storm. At 06:00 UTC the same day, Sibyl made its third landfall in Marinduque. At 12:00 UTC, the storm unofficially reached its peak intensity with 1-minute sustained winds of 110 mph (175 km/h) and made its fourth landfall in Quezon province.

At 06:00 UTC on October 1, the JMA estimated a minimum pressure of 985 hPa (29.1 inHg). That day, Sibyl exited the Philippines and entered the South China Sea. The JTWC downgraded Sibyl to a tropical storm at 18:00 UTC on October 2, with the JMA also downgrading at 06:00 UTC on October 3. Sibyl turned to the north-northwest on the early morning of October 3 and later that day, made landfall on the coast of western Guangdong. The JTWC issued its final warning for the system at 18:00 UTC on October 3. Sibyl's low-level circulation dissipated on the morning of October 4 over China, and, by 12:00 UTC on October 4, the JMA ceased tracking the system.

== Preparations, impact and aftermath ==
=== Philippines ===
Nationwide, total damage was estimated at $120 million (₱3.1 billion), including $25 million (₱1.2 billion) in damage to agriculture and $69 million (₱1.8 billion) in damage to infrastructure. (Note: Money values converted via Pacific Exchange Rate Service with an exchange rate for 1995) Between 116 and 184 people were killed, 49 people were injured, and 126 people were reported missing. Altogether, 13,234 homes were damaged, and 21,862 homes were partially damaged. The storm brought 90–200 mm (3.5–7.9 in) of rainfall, with heavy rainfall of 225–330 mm (8.9–13.0 in) recorded across Mindoro, Samar, Panay, and southern portions of Luzon. The 10-minute sustained winds of 120 km/h (75 mph) were recorded in Sangley Point on September 30. A sea-level pressure of 977.9 mb (28.88 inHg) was recorded in Tacloban.

In San Pablo City, four people were killed, one person drowned in Palayan, and three people drowned in Panay. At least one person was electrocuted as a result of the street flooding in Manila. In Valencia, the storm caused a landslide that killed 18 people, including seven children, about 530 miles (850 km) south of Manila. One tornado was reported in the Philippines. Five people were injured in Bukidnon province and three people were injured in Sorsogon. Philippine Airlines canceled 15 flights. In Cabalantian, Bacolor, 50 people were killed due to mudflows (lahars) up to 18 ft (5.5 m) high from Mount Pinatubo. A total of 3,900 homes in four other barangays were buried under deposits about 9 m (30 ft) deep, leaving all of them uninhabitable. Thousands of residents in Manila were left without electricity. 29 provinces and 28 cities were placed under a state of calamity by Philippine President Fidel V. Ramos. The government released $1 million from disaster relief to rebuild areas affected by floods and mudflows. The UNHCR office in Manila provided approximately $5,000 (₱124,000) in relief aid and the WFP office in Manila distributed roughly 11 metric tons of rice.

=== Hong Kong, Macau, and China ===
In Hong Kong, on October 1 at 5:45 pm HKT, the Royal Observatory issued a Signal No. 1. The next day, at 12:30 pm HKT, the Royal Observatory raised it to a Strong Wind Signal No. 3. The next day at 05:10 am HKT, the Royal Observatory raised it to Southeast Gale or Signal No. 8. At 11:30 am HKT the same day, the Royal Observatory downgraded it Strong Wind Signal No. 3. At 8:45 pm HKT the same day, all signals were lowered. At Kai Tak International Airport, at least 25 flights had to be delayed, canceled or diverted due to the storm. All ferry services between Hong Kong and the outer islands received disruptions, with some having to be stopped.

In Hong Kong, a falling tree struck three cars on Gascoigne Road in Kowloon. On Tai Mo Shan, peak winds of 113 km/h (70 mph) were recorded on October 3. In Shek Kong, rainfall peaked at 292.5 mm (11.52 in) over a 72-hour period. A total of 14 people were injured in Hong Kong. In a village in the New Territories, 25 people had to be rescued by firefighters after being trapped by rising waters. The Hong Kong Football Association postponed a game between the Instant-Dict and Golden teams following the hoisting of Signal No. 8. In Macau, some scaffolding collapsed and two vehicles suffered damage, although no injuries and deaths were reported.

In China, eight people were killed in Guangdong, and 30 others were reported injured. The storm caused significant damage to numerous roads and bridges, including the Guangzhou-Zhanjiang Highway's Dianbai segment. Sibyl destroyed over 180,000 ha (440,000 acres) of farmland, with more than 20,000 ha (49,000 acres) of agricultural land were inundated by floodwaters in Maoming City. Damage was estimated at $159 million (1.32 billion RMB). Flights connecting Guangzhou Baiyun Airport and Hong Kong's Kai Tak Airport were canceled on October 3, and travel to Haikou was delayed. In Zhuhai, the storm caused traffic accidents, leaving two people dead and injuring four others. Two fatalities occurred in Yangdong and Yangxi. One person was killed and several homes were extensively damaged in Xinyi. Sybil's remnants produced 80–150 millimetres (3.1–5.9 in) of rainfall across the provinces of Zhejiang, Anhui, Jiangxi, and Hunan.
