= Cyclone Sarai =

Category 2 South Pacific cyclone of 2019

Tropical Cyclone Sarai
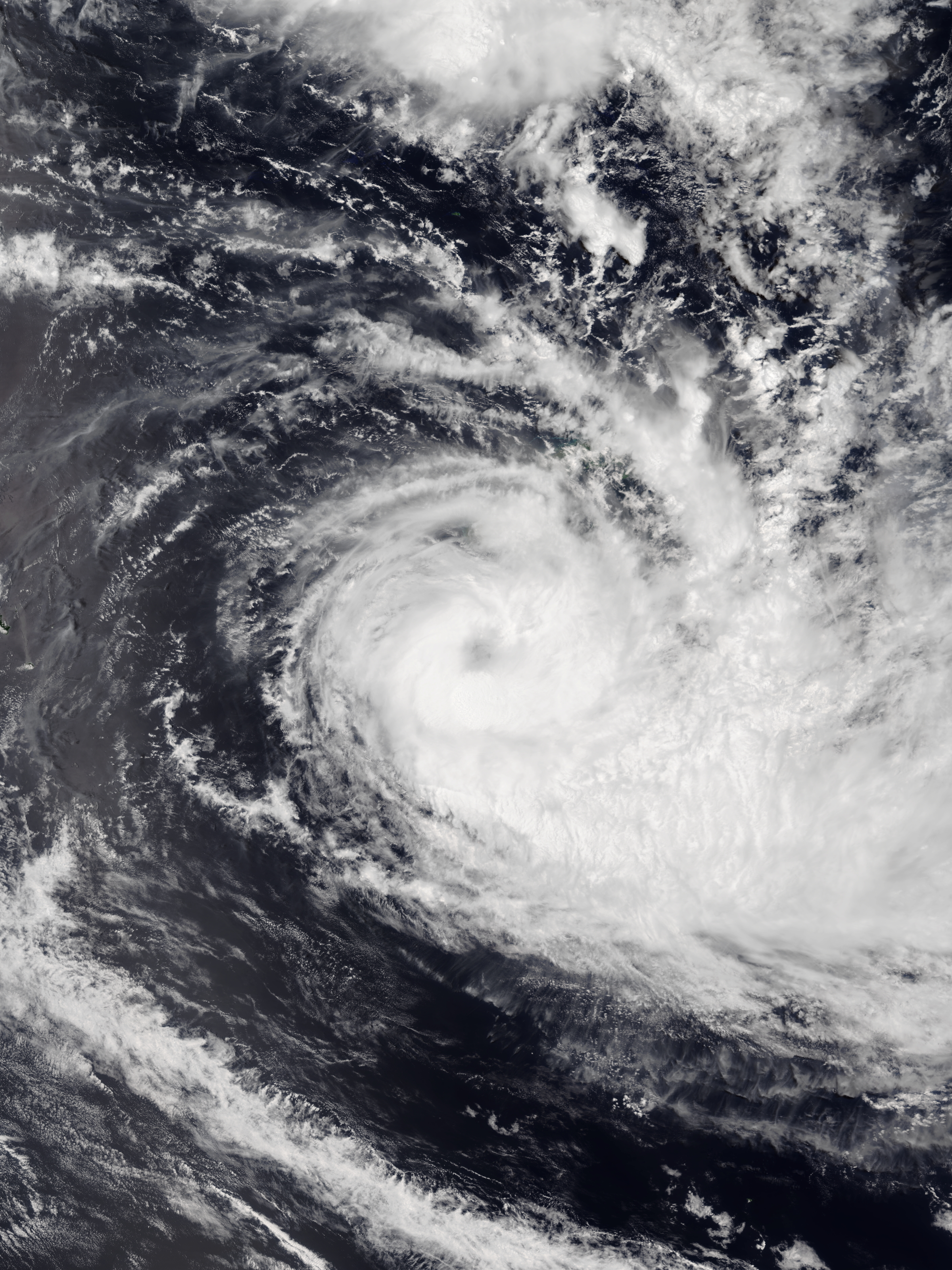
- Sarai near peak strength, to the south of Fiji on 29 December

Meteorological history
- Formed: 23 December 2019
- Extratropical: 31 December 2019
- Dissipated: 2 January 2020

Category 2 tropical cyclone
- 10-minute sustained (FMS)
- Highest winds: 110 km/h (70 mph)
- Lowest pressure: 972 hPa (mbar); 28.70 inHg

Category 1-equivalent tropical cyclone
- 1-minute sustained (SSHWS/JTWC)
- Highest winds: 140 km/h (85 mph)
- Lowest pressure: 971 hPa (mbar); 28.67 inHg

Overall effects
- Fatalities: 2 total
- Damage: $2.3 million (2019 USD)
- Areas affected: Tuvalu, Vanuatu, Fiji, Tonga, Niue, Cook Islands
- Part of the 2019–20 South Pacific cyclone season

Tropical Cyclone Sarai was a moderately strong tropical cyclone that impacted several island nations and countries in late-December 2019. The third tropical cyclone and the second named storm of the 2019-20 South Pacific cyclone season, Sarai formed from an area of low pressure to the south of Tuvalu. Over the next days, the low pressure became organized and was designated by the Fiji Meteorological Service as Tropical Disturbance 03F on 23 December. Under favorable conditions, the disturbance gradually organized, becoming a depression two days later, before strengthening to a tropical cyclone, earning the name Sarai. It moved to the south, before a high-pressure steered the system to the east, passing to the south of Fiji, near Suva before weakening. Sarai passed near the Tongan islands of Haʻapai and Tongatapu as a Category 1 cyclone, before rapidly degrading to a tropical depression due to the system entering unfavorable conditions. It was last noted on 2 January to the southeast of Cook Islands.

Ahead of Sarai, gale warnings, tropical cyclone alerts and heavy rain warnings were imposed for Fiji. These warnings were also raised on Tonga, Niue, and the southern Cook Islands. National and international flights were also canceled and many people are evacuated to different emergency shelters. Impacts were felt, starting on 22 December on the northern division of Fiji. The impacts of the cyclone were wide, from the country to Tonga and the Cook Islands. In total, Sarai claimed two lives, all in Fiji alone, and leftover FJ$5 million (US$2.3 million) worth of damages on that country. The damages in other countries affected by the cyclone, if any, were minor.

== Meteorological history ==
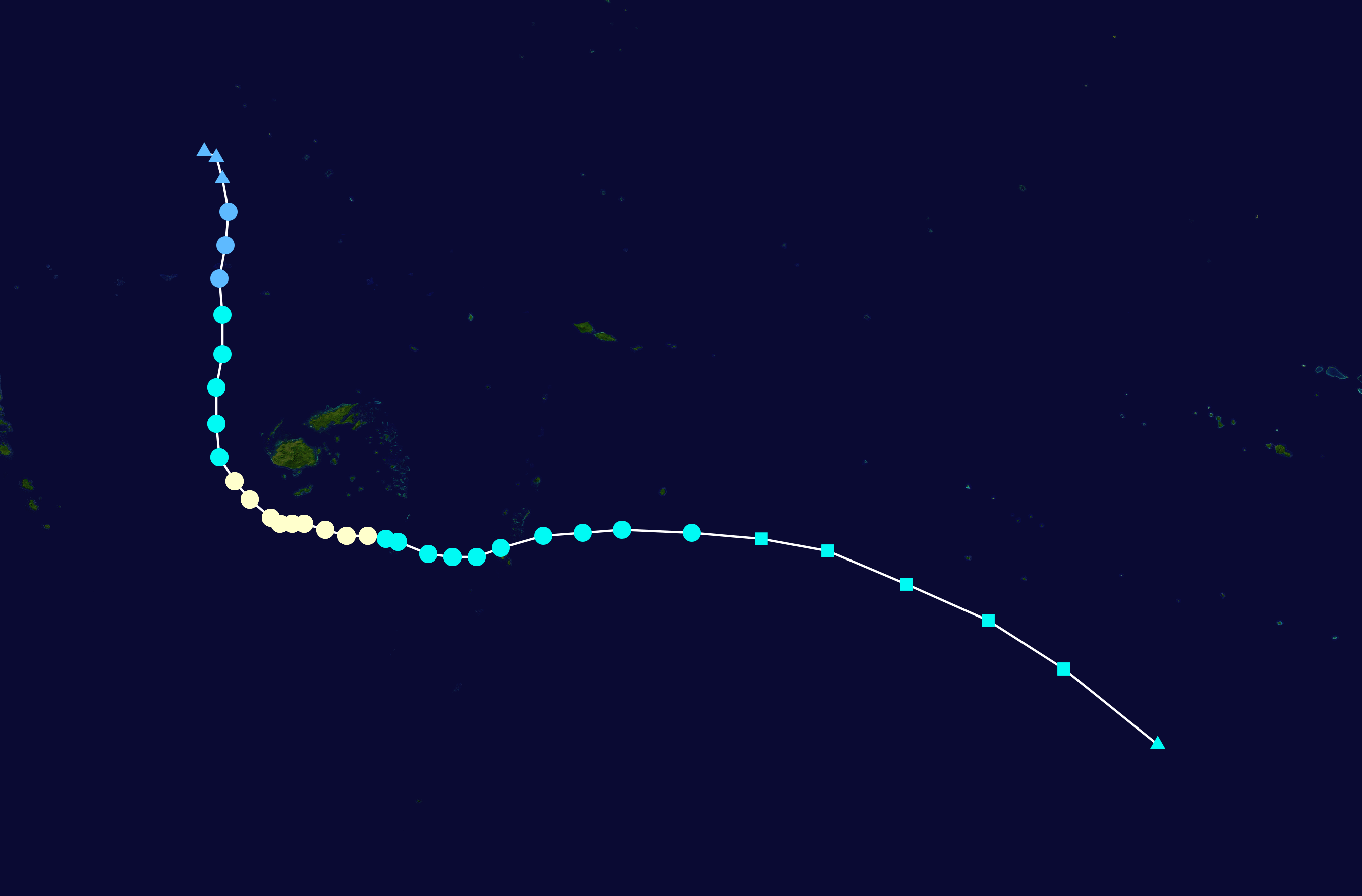
Map plotting the storm's track and intensity, according to the Saffir–Simpson scale Map key Saffir–Simpson scale Tropical depression (≤38 mph, ≤62 km/h) Tropical storm (39–73 mph, 63–118 km/h) Category 1 (74–95 mph, 119–153 km/h) Category 2 (96–110 mph, 154–177 km/h) Category 3 (111–129 mph, 178–208 km/h) Category 4 (130–156 mph, 209–251 km/h) Category 5 (≥157 mph, ≥252 km/h) Unknown Storm type Tropical cyclone Subtropical cyclone Extratropical cyclone, remnant low, tropical disturbance, or monsoon depression

During 20 December, the Fiji Meteorological Service (FMS) started to monitor an area of low pressure, located near the Solomon Islands for the possibility of tropical cyclogenesis. Over the next few days, they continued to monitor the system and assessed its potential to become a tropical cyclone. During 23 December, the FMS reported that the area of low pressure had developed into a tropical disturbance and assigned it the designator 03F, while it was located about 630 km (390 mi) to the west of Tuvalu. At this time the system was poorly organised with deep atmospheric convection, displaced to the north and east of its broad and elongated low-level circulation. The disturbance was also located underneath an upper ridge of high pressure within a favourable environment for further development, with low to moderate vertical windshear and warm sea surface temperatures of 29–30 °C (84–86 °F). The FMS expected at this time that the disturbance would track just to the west of the Yasawa and Mamanuca Islands, before turning and moving southeastwards to the south of Kadavu towards the southern Lau Islands. However, it was noted that the movement of tropical cyclones could be erratic within the region and that some weather models were predicting that the system would make landfall on Viti Levu.

Over the next couple of days, the system moved southwards and gradually developed further with its overall organisation improving, before it was classified as a tropical depression by the FMS during 25 December. After being classified as a tropical depression, the system continued to develop, with its outflow improving and deep convection wrapping on to the systems low level circulation center. During 26 December, the United States Joint Typhoon Warning Center initiated advisories on the depression and designated it as Tropical Cyclone 04P, before the FMS reported that the system had become a Category 1 tropical cyclone on the Australian tropical cyclone intensity scale and named it Sarai. At this time, Sarai was being steered southwards to the west of Fiji, along the edge of a near-equatorial ridge of high pressure and the jetstream. Over the next couple of days, the system gradually intensified further and was classified as a Category 2 tropical cyclone during 27 December, while it was located around 220 km (135 mi) to the west of Nadi, Fiji. As the system turned south-eastwards later that day, the JTWC noted that there was significant uncertainty in the model guidance over Sarai's future track, as a trough of low pressure approached the ridge of high pressure and weakened it. In particular, the ECMWF and NAVGEM models showed that the system would meander near Viti Levu or move northwards over Fiji, while other models showed that the system would move eastwards towards Fiji's Lau Islands and Tonga or northeastwards towards American Samoa.

During 28 December, as Sarai passed about 100 km (60 mi) to the south of Fiji's Kadavu Island, the FMS estimated that the system had peaked as a Category 2 tropical cyclone with 10-minute sustained winds of 110 km/h (70 mph). During that day as the system continued to move eastwards the system briefly developed an eye, while the model guidance came into better agreement over Sarai's future track. The JTWC also estimated that Sarai had peaked with 1-minute sustained winds of 140 km/h (85 mph), which made it equivalent to a Category 1 hurricane on the Saffir-Simpson hurricane wind scale. Over the next couple of days, the system gradually weakened as it was steered eastwards towards Tonga, with its low level circulation center becoming partially exposed and atmospheric convection significantly decreased as vertical wind shear increased. During 30 December, the FMS reported that Sarai had weakened into a Category 1 tropical cyclone, before it passed over the Tongan island groups of Ha'apai and Tongatapu later that day. The system subsequently rapidly decayed during the next day, with atmospheric convection was displaced over 90 km (55 mi) to the southeast of the systems ragged and fully exposed low level circulation center. As a result, the JTWC issued their final advisory on Sarai, while the FMS reported that had degenerated into a tropical depression. The remnant tropical depression continued to move east-southeastwards and passed about 215 km (135 mi) to the southeast of the island nation of Niue later that day. The system was last noted by the FMS during 2 January, while it was located about 180 km (110 mi) to the southeast of Rarotonga in the Cook Islands.

== Preparations ==
=== Fiji ===
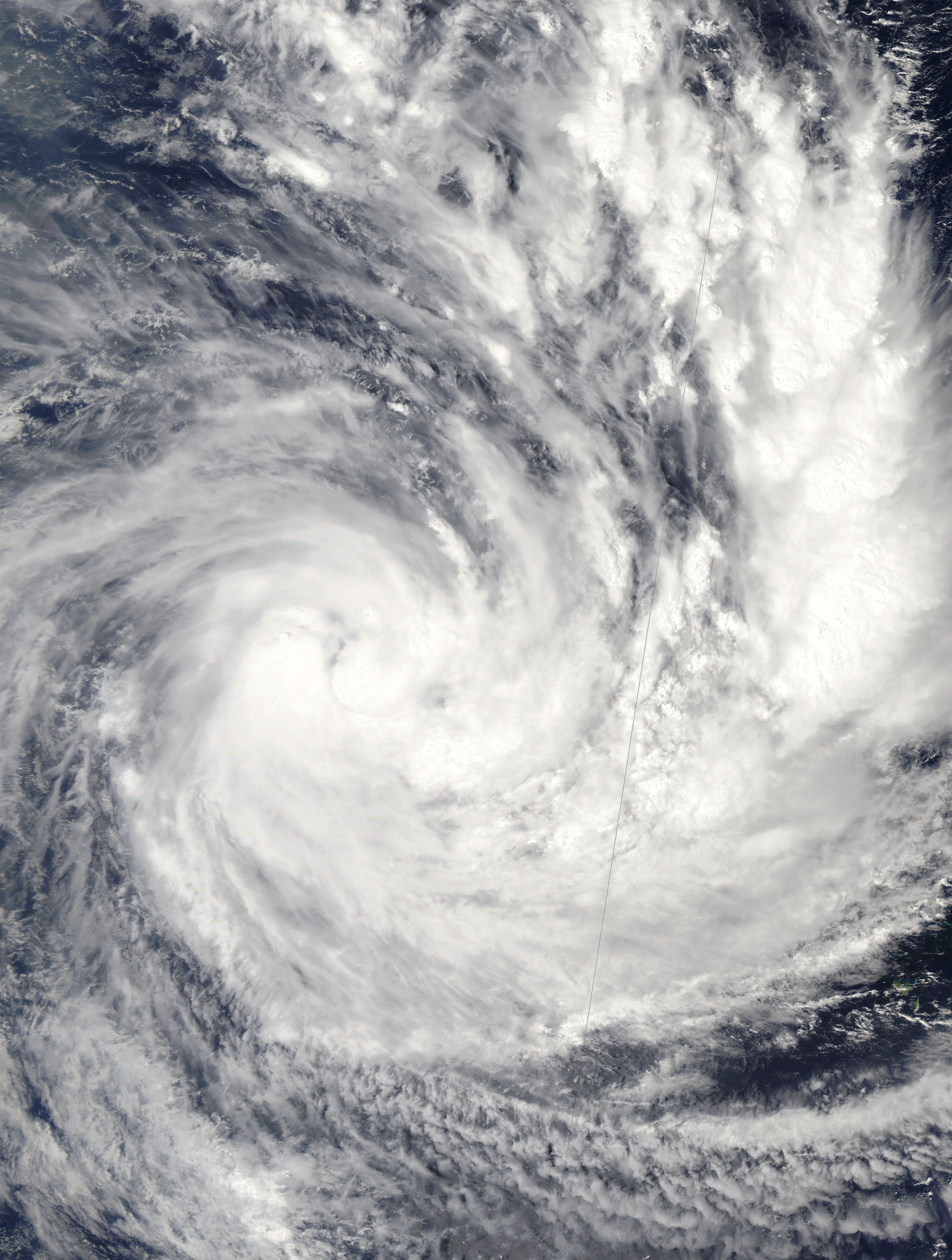
Sarai strengthening west of Fiji on December 27

During 25 December, after 03F had become a tropical depression, the FMS issued a gale warning for the Fijian dependency of Rotuma and warned that gale-force winds were possible on the island within the next 24 hours. They also warned of heavy and frequent rain showers, rough to heavy seas, damaging northerly swells and noted that sea flooding of low-level coastal areas was expected. At the same time a tropical cyclone alert and a heavy rain warning were issued for the rest of the Fijian islands. Over the next few days, the FMS gradually replaced the tropical cyclone alert, with gale and storm warnings for various islands in the archipelago, including Viti Levu, Vanua Levu, Kadavu and Taveuni. The FMS also issued various flood alerts, flood and flash flood warnings for low-lying areas, small streams and areas adjacent to major rivers in the northern, central and western division.

Ahead of Sarai impacting the island nation, national and international flights and all shipping services were cancelled, while others were brought forward by several hours to avoid the system's effects. The National Disaster Management Office also activated its emergency shelters and advised people to have their "disaster kits" ready, while the Ministry of Health and Medical Services suspended their national measles vaccination campaign. Flash flood warnings issued by the FMS prompted the evacuation of 360 people to 15 shelters in the city of Lautoka and on the island of Ovalau. the NDMO reported 2,121 people sought shelter in 55 shelters throughout Fiji. Police presence was increased in all Fijian divisions to both facilitate evacuation and rescue operations and bolster crime patrol during the storm.

=== Tonga ===
During 27 December, the Tonga Meteorological Service activated its Fua'amotu Tropical Cyclone Warning Centre and issued a tropical cyclone alert for the whole of Tonga on Sarai. This alert was kept in force over the next couple of days, along with strong wind and heavy rain warnings as well as flash flood advisories. A gale warning was issued for the island groups of Tongatapu and Eua as well as the coastal waters of Tele-Ki-Tonga and Tele-Ki-Tokelau during 28 December. A gale warning was subsequently issued for Vava'u and Ha'apai during 30 December, as it appeared that Sarai was now moving towards the island groups. In preparation for Sarai impacting the island nation, international flights to and from Tonga were cancelled, while evacuation centers in the island groups were opened and stocked with emergency supplies by the Tonga Red Cross Society and other relief agencies.

=== Niue and the southern Cook Islands ===
During 31 December, the FMS issued a gale warning for the island of Niue, as winds of between 55–65 km/h (35–40 mph) were expected to impact the island nation. Heavy rain, heavy swells and sea flooding were also predicted to impact parts of the island nation, while flooding of low-lying coastal areas was also expected. At this time, the system was located about 460 km (285 mi) to the west-southwest of Niue. This warning was cancelled by the FMS later that day as Sarai weakened into a tropical depression, however, it was still expected to produce strong winds of up to 55 km/h (35 mph) on the island.

On 1 January, the FMS issued a gale warning for the Southern Cook Islands as winds of between 45–75 km/h (30–45 mph) were expected to impact the islands. Heavy rain, squally thunderstorms, high seas and heavy swells were also predicted to impact the island nation, while flooding of low-lying coastal areas was also expected. At this time, the system was located about 130 km (80 mi) to the south-southwest of the island of Rarotonga and was moving towards the east-southeast at about 9 km/h (5.6 mph). As a result of these conditions, the Cook Islands Police Service warned residents to exercise extreme caution and avoid beachfront areas on the western side of Rarotonga, including the seawall in Nikao.

== Impact ==
=== Fiji ===
Sarai impacted Fiji between 26–30 December, where it was responsible for two deaths and at least FJ$5 million (US$2.3 million) in damage.

Strong winds and heavy rain associated with Sarai started to impact Fiji's northern division during 26 December, with rainfall totals of 144 mm (5.7 in), 117 mm (4.6 in) & 116 mm (4.6 in) recorded at the weather stations in Saqani, Vaturekuka and at Udu Point. Over the next few days, gale to storm-force winds as well as heavy rain impacted western and southern Fiji. Strong winds caused power outages in parts of Nadi. Widespread power outages also afflicted Fiji's Central, Northern, and Western Divisions. One person was hospitalised after being struck by a falling tree. One person drowned in strong currents off Kadavu Island while another person drowned crossing a flooded road in Vunidawa. A vehicle carrying six passengers was swept away in Naqelewai after attempting to cross a flooded bridge, though all were uninjured. Widespread flooding occurred in low-lying areas. On Matuku Island, sustained winds topped out at 74 km/h (46 mph) on the morning of 29 December with gusts to 93 km/h (58 mph). In the Nadarivatu District, 327 mm (12.9 in) of rain was recorded over a 24-hour period between 27–28 December; 126 mm (5.0 in) was recorded at Nadi International Airport over the same timeframe. Rough surf was experienced in Fijian waters, including offshore Levuka.

While the initial damage assessment indicated damage to critical infrastructures were minimal, tropical Sarai disrupted services for water supply, electricity, public transport and road accessibility. Damages to agricultural commodities may-be substantial in some areas. At the time of the production of this report, Unfortunately, there were two confirmed casualties of tropical cyclone Sarai, one in Naitasiri and the other in Kadavu, both victims of drowning.

=== Tonga ===
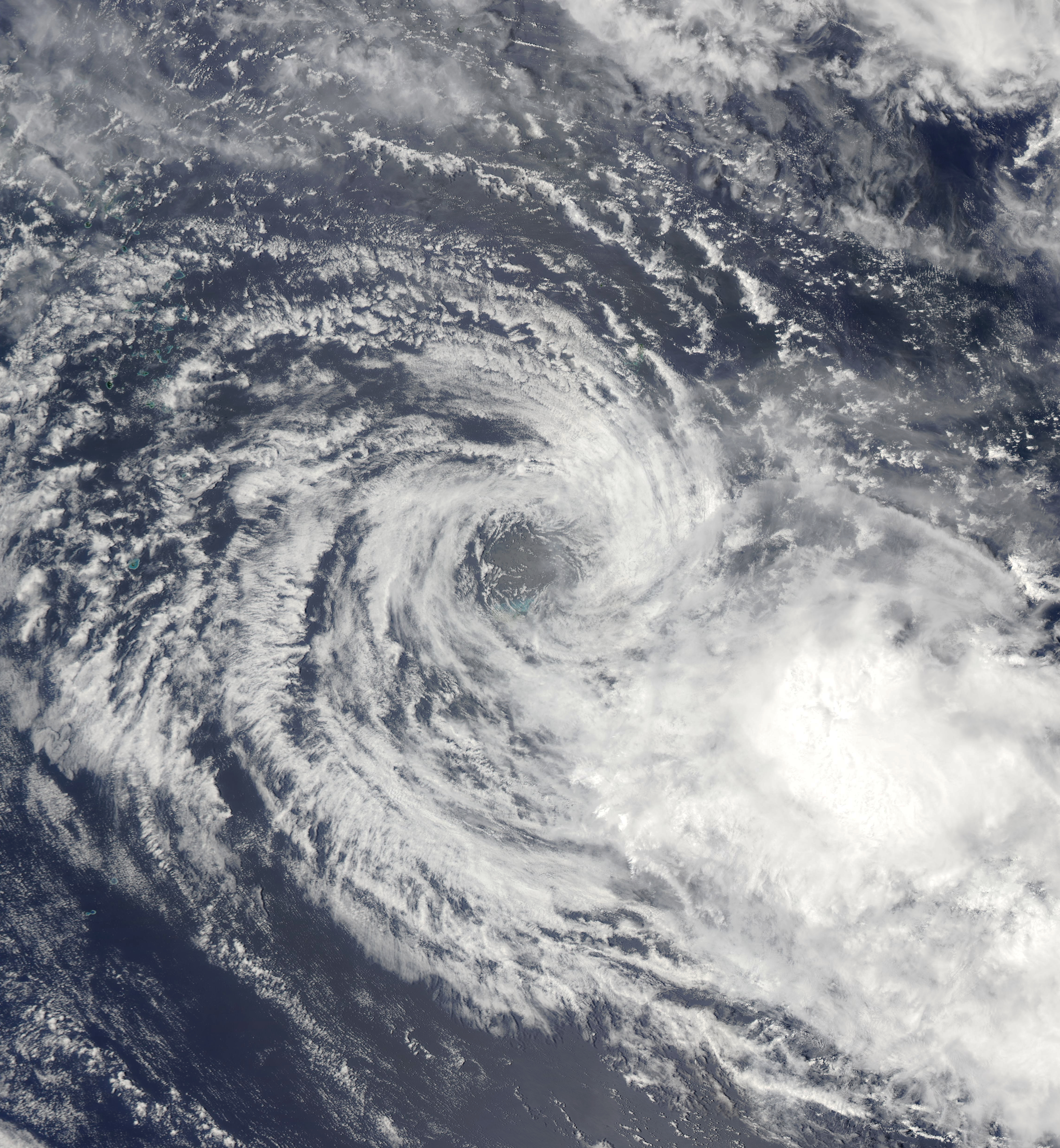
Sarai weakening over Tongatapu on December 31

The centre of Sarai passed over Tongatapu, Tonga's main island, on December 31. Flights connecting to Nuku'alofa via Fua'amotu International Airport were disrupted, affecting an estimated 1,220 travellers. Damage was generally minor on the island; flooding affected areas with poor drainage and winds knocked down power lines. Sarai produced a waterspout that moved onshore and damaged homes in Ha'ateiho on Tongatapu on December 30. The roof of a church and a store were also damaged by the tornado, which lasted for 2-3 minutes. Another waterspout touched down in the Ha'apai island group but caused no damage. Ahead of the system impacting Tonga, evacuation centres were set up, however, there were no reports of anyone seeking shelter. There were also no reports of any injuries, deaths, while minor damage was reported, with some flooding reported in areas with poor drainage, fallen power lines, and flattened vegetation. The major damage so far was caused by the tornado were unknown, which ripped through Ha'ateiho homes on Monday, but there were no injuries or deaths reported.

=== Niue and the southern Cook Islands ===
The system passed, approximately 215 km (135 mi) to the southeast of the island nation of Niue. However, the damages, if any were minor.

Various people ignored the warnings imposed in the southern Cook Islands and lined the beaches to take photos of the storm while others drove their vehicles and bikes through the high waves that had come in over the seawall and covered the road. One person was seen climbing over the seawall and into the direct path of the storm's impact, however, there were no reports of any injuries. Large trees on the island were uprooted, snapped, and scattered across properties by strong winds, while coconuts, vegetation, and debris brought in by the tide were also scattered across properties. Boats docked within Avatiu Harbour were severely impacted, while the police vessel Te Kukupa smashed its mooring and had to be taken to the northern side of the island to wait out the storm.

== Retirement ==
Due to its effects on several islands, the cyclone name, Sarai, was retired and replaced with Samadiyo for future usage.

== See also ==
- Cyclone Tino
- Cyclone Ana
