= Tropical Storm Sonia (2013) =

Pacific tropical storm in 2013

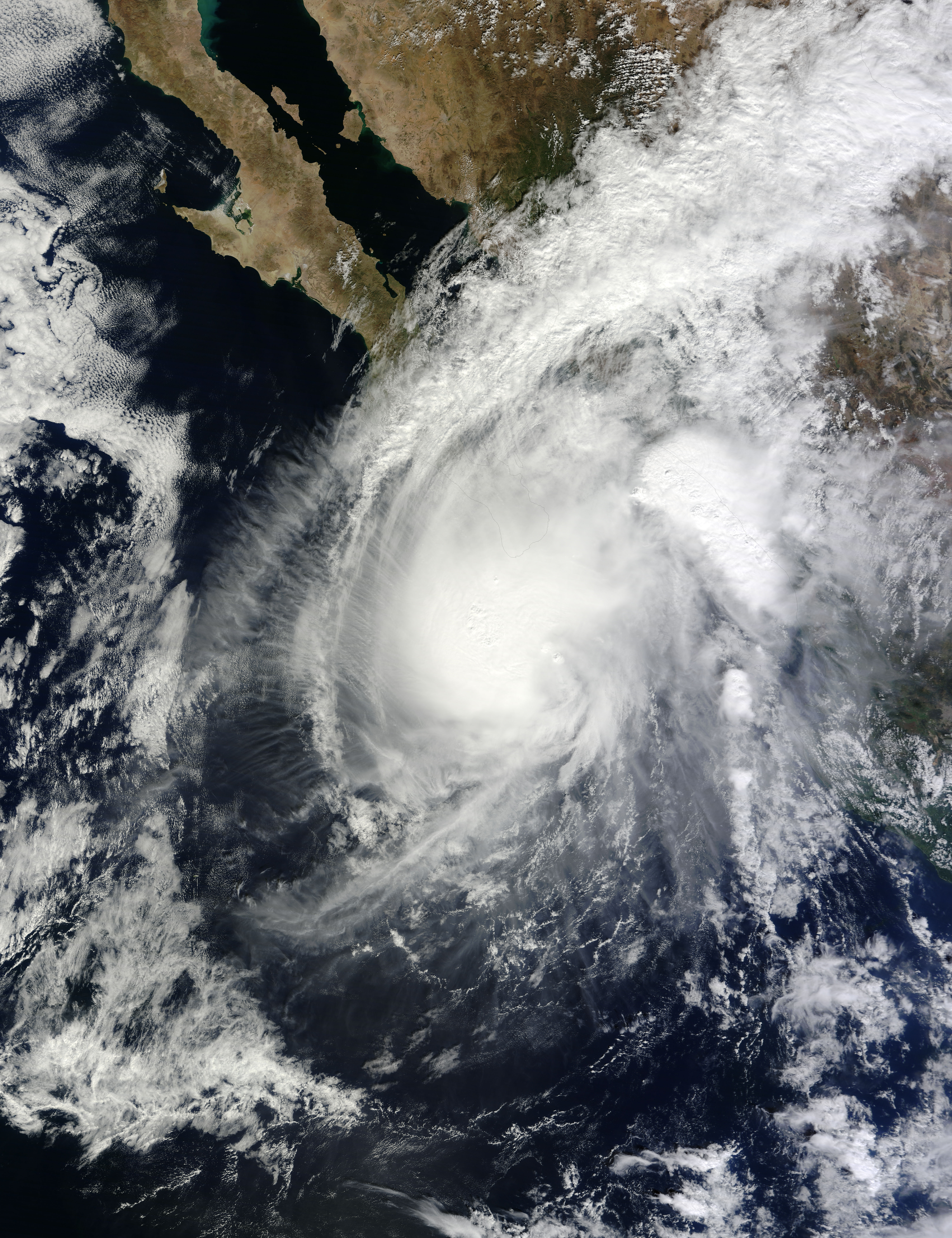
- Tropical Storm Sonia approaching Mexico at peak intensity on November 3

Meteorological history
- Formed: November 1, 2013
- Dissipated: November 4, 2013

Tropical storm
- 1-minute sustained (SSHWS/NWS)
- Highest winds: 45 mph (75 km/h)
- Lowest pressure: 1002 mbar (hPa); 29.59 inHg

Overall effects
- Fatalities: 2 direct
- Damage: $690,000 (2013 USD)
- Areas affected: Northwestern Mexico
- Part of the 2013 Pacific hurricane season

Tropical Storm Sonia was a weak, late-season tropical cyclone that made a rare landfall in the Mexican state of Sinaloa during early-November 2013.

== Meteorological history ==
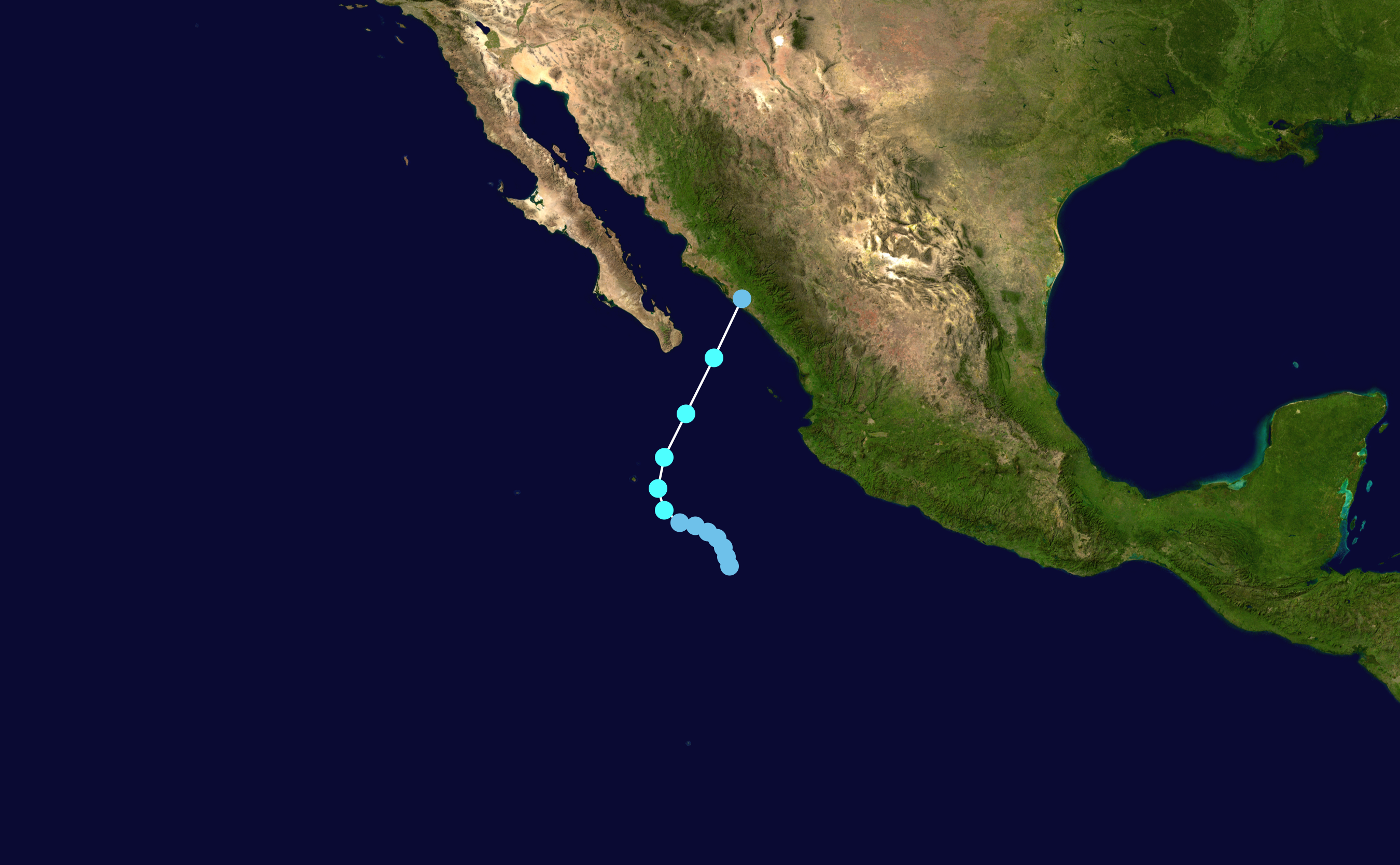
Map plotting the storm's track and intensity, according to the Saffir–Simpson scale Map key Saffir–Simpson scale Tropical depression (≤38 mph, ≤62 km/h) Tropical storm (39–73 mph, 63–118 km/h) Category 1 (74–95 mph, 119–153 km/h) Category 2 (96–110 mph, 154–177 km/h) Category 3 (111–129 mph, 178–208 km/h) Category 4 (130–156 mph, 209–251 km/h) Category 5 (≥157 mph, ≥252 km/h) Unknown Storm type Tropical cyclone Subtropical cyclone Extratropical cyclone, remnant low, tropical disturbance, or monsoon depression

The origins of Tropical Storm Sonia can be traced to a well-defined active phase of the Madden–Julian oscillation (MJO) that traversed eastward from the Central Pacific during late-October 2013. This was credited to the development of a very-broad low-level cyclonic circulation, over an area of nearly 15° of longitude well offshore Mexico. A tropical wave located several hundred miles to the south of Acapulco gradually entered the cyclonic circulation late on October 26, producing deep convection. Over the next couple of days convective activity halted, until becoming active again following the passage of the MJO on October 29, aiding the formation of a trough of low pressure. The trough slowly drifted northward in a passage between a mid-level ridge over the Gulf of Mexico and a deep mid-to-upper level trough over the Western United States. At 6:00 UTC the next day, the National Hurricane Center (NHC) began to monitor the disturbance for potential tropical cyclogenesis over the next few days.

== Preparations and impact ==
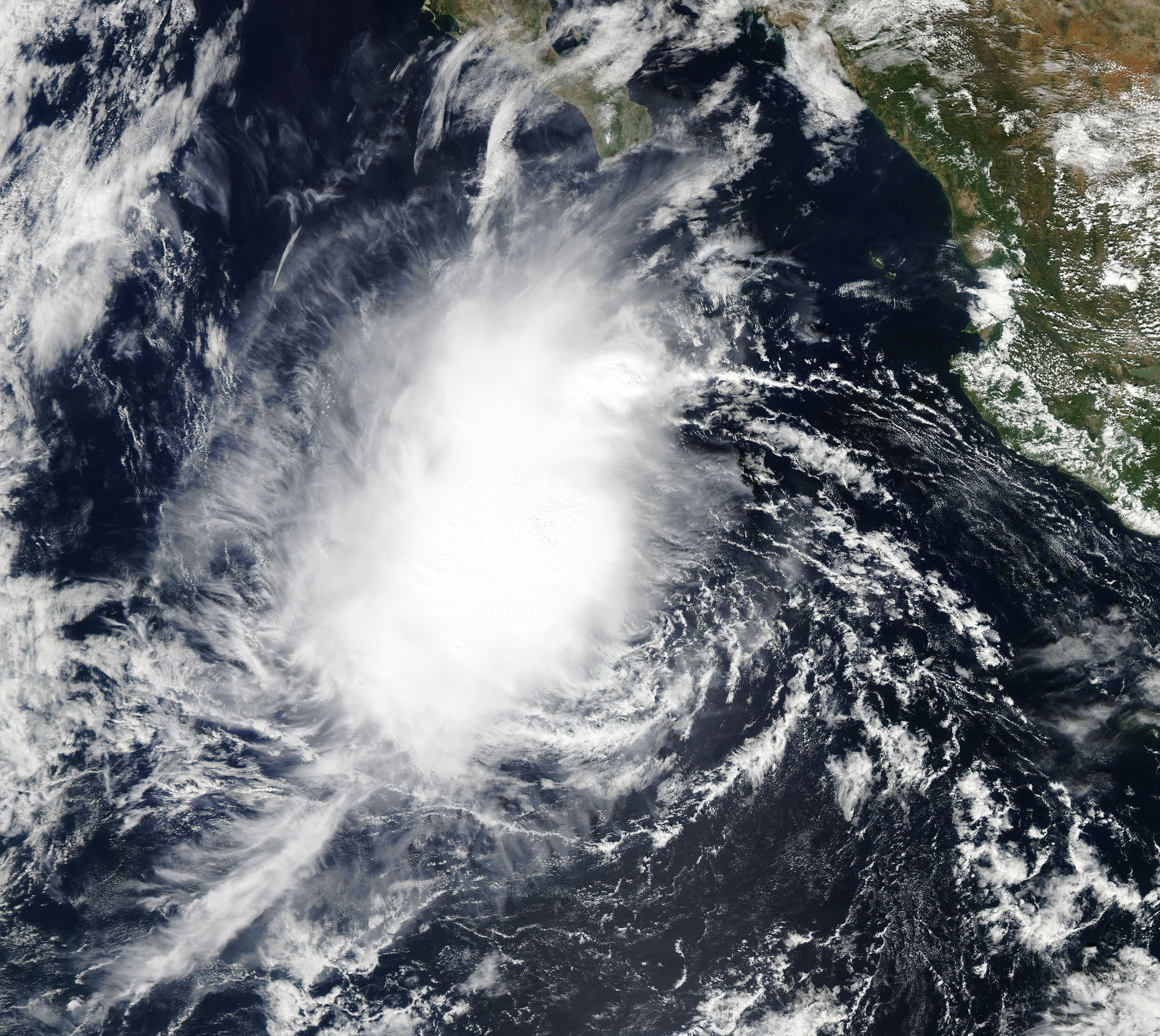
Sonia as a tropical depression nearing tropical storm status, late on November 2

In advance of Sonia, a tropical storm warning was issued from Altata to Mazatlán, Sinaloa, with a tropical storm watch extending to Topolobampo. An overall green alert was issued for Mexico by the Global Disaster Alert and Coordination System (GDACS), signifying a low-level of danger. Secretariat of Security and Civilian Protection (SSCP) declared an orange alert for southern Baja California Sur, a yellow alert for central and southern Sinaloa, a green alert for northern Baja California Sur, northern Sinaloa, southern Sonora, southern Chihuahua, Durango, Nayarit, Zacatecas, and the Islas Marías. In addition, a blue alert was put in effect for central Sonora and central Chihuahua. Ahead of the storm, classes were cancelled in five municipalities of Sinaloa. Local officials prepared more than 60 temporary shelters in Cabo San Lucas and Sinaloa. The Port of Cabo San Lucas shut down on November 3 with the threat of Sonia, closing to ships with more than 500 tons (1 million lbs.) of cargo. Tourists boats meant for water activities were also prohibited from leaving port. As a precautionary measure, over 1,000 residents were evacuated in the cities of Culiacán and Navolato.

Sonia produced heavy rainfall across western Mexico Mexico. Several inches of precipitation was recorded in Cabo San Lucas along with winds of around 30 mph (50 km/h), as the storm passed close to the resort city. Heavy precipitation also occurred in the states of Nayarit, Jalisco, Durango, Chihuahua, and Aguascalientes. In Nayarit, one person was killed after being struck by lightning according to the Secretariat of National Defense (SEDENA). Overall damage was minor, with estimates in Sinaloa is estimated to be MXN$8.8 million (US$690,000).

== See also ==
- Tropical cyclones in 2013
- Tropical Storm Norman (2012) — affected similar areas.
