= Typhoon Sarah (1989) =

Pacific typhoon in 1989

Typhoon Sarah (Openg)
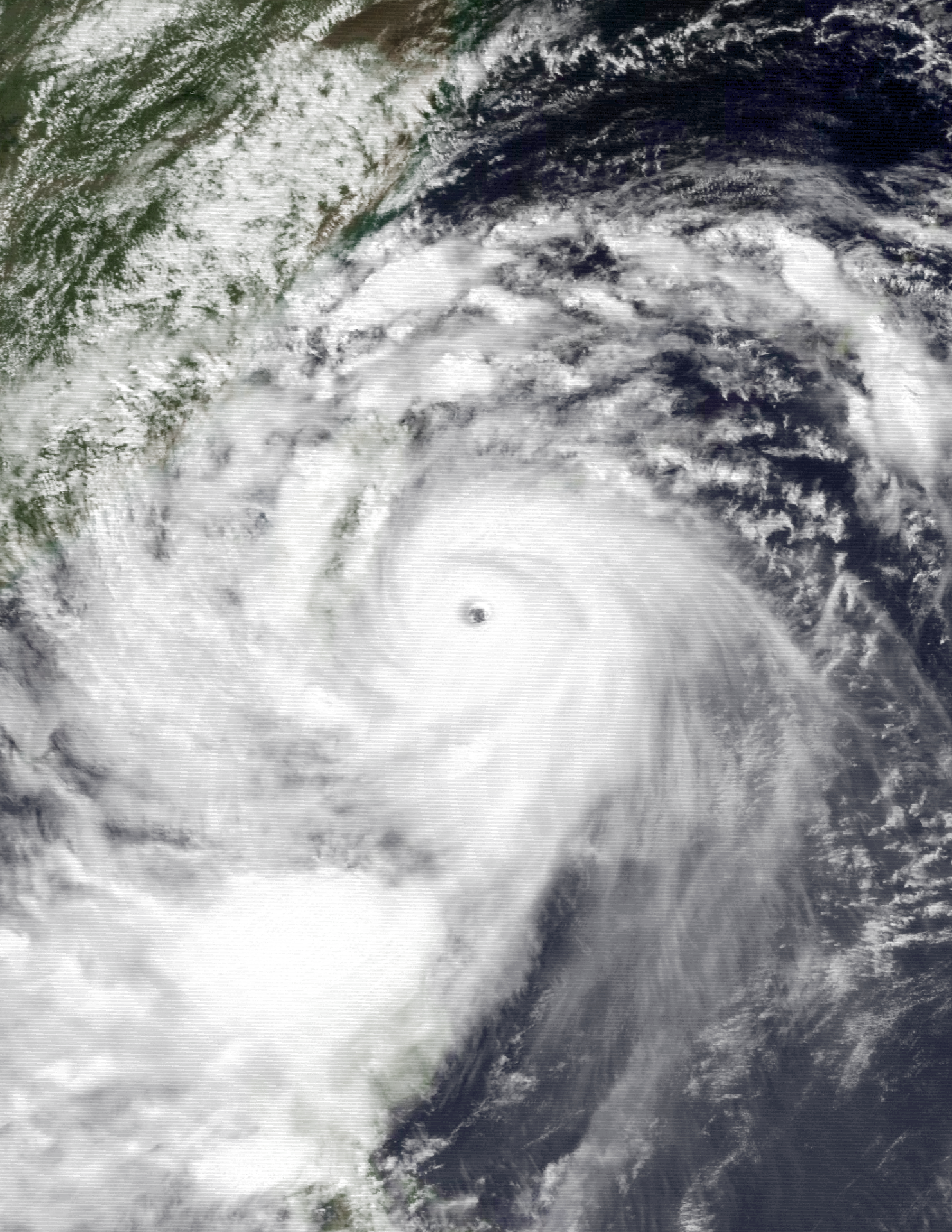
- Typhoon Sarah near peak intensity on September 11, 1989

Meteorological history
- Formed: September 5, 1989
- Dissipated: September 14, 1989

Typhoon
- 10-minute sustained (JMA)
- Highest winds: 150 km/h (90 mph)
- Lowest pressure: 950 hPa (mbar); 28.05 inHg

Category 4-equivalent typhoon
- 1-minute sustained (SSHWS/JTWC)
- Highest winds: 230 km/h (145 mph)
- Lowest pressure: 916 hPa (mbar); 27.05 inHg

Overall effects
- Fatalities: 71 total
- Damage: $175 million (1989 USD)
- Areas affected: Philippines, Ryukyu Islands, Taiwan, China
- IBTrACS
- Part of the 1989 Pacific typhoon season

Typhoon Sarah, known in the Philippines as Typhoon Openg, was a powerful typhoon that caused extensive damage along an erratic path across the Western Pacific in September 1989. Originating from a disturbance within a monsoon trough in early September, Sarah was first classified as a tropical depression near the Mariana Islands on September 5. Moving quickly westward, the depression soon strengthened into Tropical Storm Sarah. On September 8, the storm abruptly turned southward and temporarily attained typhoon status. Following a series of interactions with secondary areas of low pressure, the storm turned northward the following day. By September 11, Sarah entered a region favoring development and underwent a period of explosive intensification. At the end of this phase, the storm attained its peak intensity as a Category 4–equivalent typhoon on the Saffir–Simpson Hurricane Scale. The typhoon subsequently weakened rapidly and made two landfalls in Taiwan by September 12. After moving over the Taiwan Strait, Sarah made its final landfall in Eastern China on September 13 before dissipating the following day.

While the typhoon meandered near the Philippines, it brought several days of heavy rain to much of Luzon, triggering extensive flash flooding. At least 44 people perished across the country and another 200,000 were left homeless. Striking Taiwan as a strong typhoon, Sarah caused widespread wind damage that left approximately 840,000 residents without power. Excessive rainfall associated with the storm triggered flooding that washed away highways and inundated about 40,500 hectares (100,000 acres) of farmland. Throughout the island, Sarah was responsible for 19 fatalities and at least US$171 million (4.38 billion New Taiwan dollars) in damage. (Note: All monetary values are in 1989 USD unless otherwise stated.) Four deaths also took place on the Gotō Islands. Additionally, four deaths took place offshore and another seventeen people were listed as missing.

== Meteorological history ==
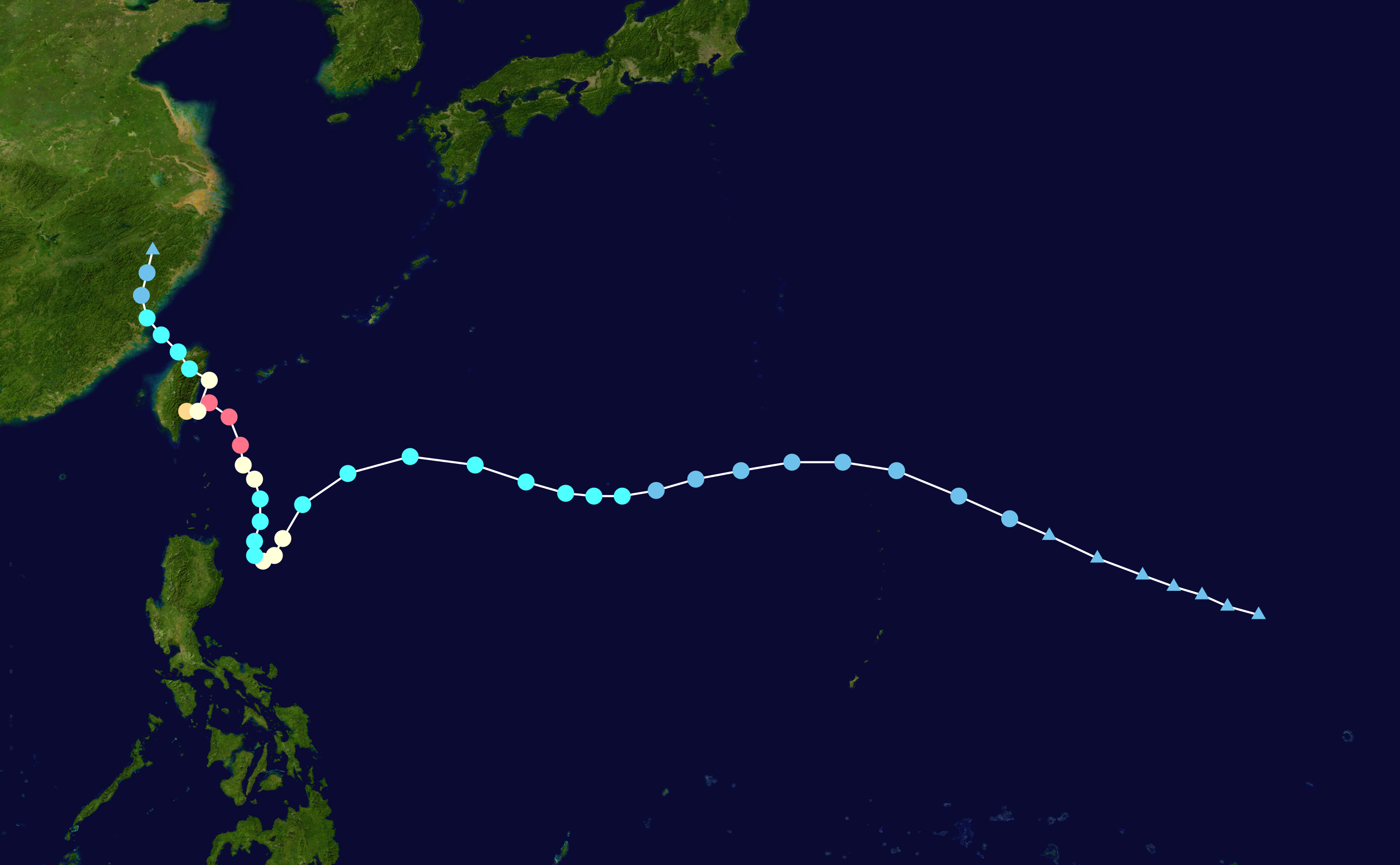
Map plotting the storm's track and intensity, according to the Saffir–Simpson scale Map key Saffir–Simpson scale Tropical depression (≤38 mph, ≤62 km/h) Tropical storm (39–73 mph, 63–118 km/h) Category 1 (74–95 mph, 119–153 km/h) Category 2 (96–110 mph, 154–177 km/h) Category 3 (111–129 mph, 178–208 km/h) Category 4 (130–156 mph, 209–251 km/h) Category 5 (≥157 mph, ≥252 km/h) Unknown Storm type Tropical cyclone Subtropical cyclone Extratropical cyclone, remnant low, tropical disturbance, or monsoon depression

In early September 1989, a monsoon trough became established across the western Pacific. By September 3, a disturbance formed within the trough approximately 1,100 km (680 mi) southeast of the Japanese island of Minamitorishima. Initially, a tropical upper tropospheric trough (TUTT) to the northwest inhibited convective development; however, "complex interactions", according to Lt. Cdr. Nicholas D. Gural, later occurred between the TUTT cell, the initial disturbance, and a second disturbance, which resulted in favorable conditions for tropical cyclogenesis. Due to the improved environment, the Joint Typhoon Warning Center (JTWC) issued two Tropical Cyclone Formation Alerts on the system on September 5. (Note: The Joint Typhoon Warning Center is a joint United States Navy – United States Air Force task force that issues tropical cyclone warnings for the western Pacific Ocean and other regions.) By this time, the Japan Meteorological Agency (JMA) began monitoring the system as a tropical depression. (Note: The Japan Meteorological Agency is the official Regional Specialized Meteorological Center for the western Pacific Ocean.) Ultimately, the JTWC issued their first advisory on Tropical Depression 22W early on September 6, at which time the depression was situated northwest of the Mariana Islands.

Initially, the depression tracked west-southwestwards and gradually intensified; however, after being upgraded to Tropical Storm Sarah late on September 6, the system turned northwestward and accelerated towards Okinawa. By September 8, Sarah decelerated as it underwent a binary interaction with a secondary area of convection to the southwest. This interaction caused the cyclone to abruptly turn southwestward towards the Philippines before nearly stalling on September 9. During this time, the storm temporarily attained typhoon status, having estimated winds of 120 km/h (75 mph). Coinciding with Sarah's time as a typhoon, a new area of low pressure, classified as a "lee side low", developed along the west coast of Luzon. Due to the cyclone's proximity to the Philippines, the Philippine Atmospheric, Geophysical and Astronomical Services Administration also monitored the storm and assigned it with the local name Openg.

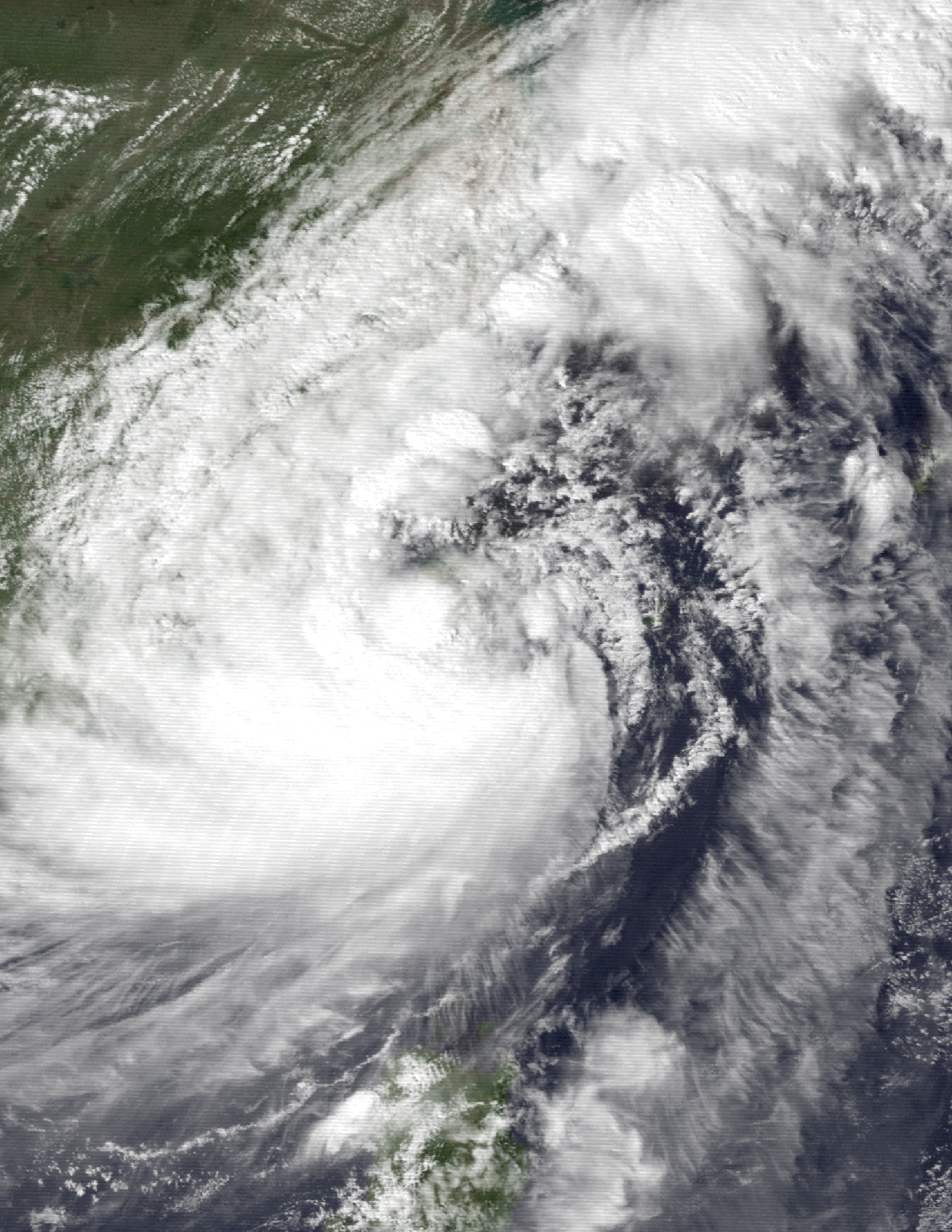
Sarah over Taiwan on September 12

Later on September 9, Sarah turned sharply northward as the lee side low rapidly tracked northeast. Reintensification gradually took place as the storm moved away from the Philippines, with the storm reaching typhoon status by September 10. Tracking generally towards the north-northwest, Sarah entered a favorable region for development and underwent a period of explosive intensification on September 11. Over a six-hour span, the storm's winds increased from 140 to 215 km/h (87 to 134 mph). A powerful typhoon, Sarah featured a well-defined eye and multiple outflow channels. The storm reached its peak strength later that day as a Category 4–equivalent typhoon on the Saffir–Simpson Hurricane Scale with winds of 230 km/h (140 mph). The JMA assessed Sarah to have been somewhat weaker, estimating peak ten-minute sustained winds of 150 km/h (93 mph) along with a barometric pressure of 950 mbar (hPa; 28.05 inHg).

Forecasters at the JTWC initially projected the storm to track north of Taiwan on September 12 and merge with an approaching frontal system. Contrary to this, Sarah moved south of the expected path and quickly weakened as it interacted with the mountainous terrain of Taiwan. The storm eventually struck the island with winds of 165 km/h (103 mph) late on September 11. Unexpectedly, the typhoon executed a counterclockwise loop and briefly moved offshore before making a second landfall 12 hours later along the northeastern coast of Taiwan as a tropical storm. Sarah failed to reorganize as it moved over the Taiwan Strait and later made its final landfall in Zhejiang, China as a minimal tropical storm on September 13. The storm was last noted the following day as dissipating over Eastern China.

== Impact ==
=== Philippines ===
Although the storm did not make landfall in the Philippines, its close proximity brought several days of heavy rain to Luzon, leading to widespread flash floods and mudslides. Landslides across the region isolated many cities, including Baguio. Rivers began exceeding their banks on September 10 and flooded surrounding areas. In the province of Ilocos Sur, ten people were killed in a single town after flood waters swept away many homes overnight. In many areas, waters were waist-deep and officials advised residents in low-lying areas to move to higher ground. Tropical storm force winds, recorded up to 88 km/h (55 mph) at the John Hay Air Base, also impacted the country. In Zambales Province, a tornado spawned by the typhoon injured three people and caused approximately $90,000 worth of damage. Another tornado struck the Clark Air Base, uprooting trees and damaging buildings. Losses from this tornado reached $150,000.

At least 44 people were killed in various incidents related to Typhoon Sarah in the Philippines while another three were reported missing. A total of 1,157 homes were destroyed and another 24,638 sustained damage, leaving approximately 200,000 people homeless. Damage from the storm was placed at $4.3 million. In light of the severity of damage caused by Sarah, a state of calamity was declared for northern provinces. Less than a week after the storm, additional rains in areas affected by Sarah triggered landslides that killed at least 16 people. Officials blamed the landslides on rocks loosened by the typhoon's rains.

=== Taiwan ===
On September 10, meteorologists across Taiwan warned residents of torrential rain across the country, especially in mountainous areas where more than 1,000 mm (39 in) could fall. The Central Weather Bureau also advised vessels in the Bashi Channel to be cautious or rough seas associated with the typhoon. Most flights to and from the island were canceled by September 11 for the duration of the storm; however, rail service continued for another day. Approximately 10,000 volunteer firefighters were placed on alert and city police were called in to organize evacuation centers.

Striking Taiwan as a powerful typhoon, destructive winds battered coastal areas near where the center moved ashore. According to officials in Taiwan, winds were recorded up to 174 km/h (108 mph) with gusts to 208 km/h (129 mph). These winds downed thousands of trees and power lines, leaving an estimated 840,000 residents without electricity. A total of 272,000 telephone lines were damaged or destroyed by the storm. Excessive rainfall triggered widespread flash flooding that inundated agricultural areas and paralyzed transportation as roads and bridges were washed away. On September 11, the Suhua Highway was shut down due to landslides. In Hualien City, flood waters reached a depth of 1.2 m (3.9 ft) and several homes were destroyed, leaving roughly 100 people homeless. Across the island, 28 homes were destroyed and another 41 sustained damage. At least 19 people perished in Taiwan and another 14 were reported missing. At least 40,500 hectares (100,000 acres) of farmland was submerged by flood waters. Agricultural losses related to Typhoon Sarah reached US$171 million (4.38 billion New Taiwan dollars).

Offshore, a 12,800-ton Panamanian freighter, the Lung Hao, broke in two amidst rough seas produced by the typhoon. Twenty-one people were rescued by police after the vessel drifted 1 km (0.62 mi) to shore; however, four people were listed as missing. After two days of search and rescue efforts, officials deemed their chance of survival to be very slim and the four missing crew members were declared dead on September 14.

=== Elsewhere ===
Heavy rains from the outer bands of Sarah also affected much of southwestern Japan. In the Gotō Islands, 476 mm (18.7 in) of rain triggered several landslides, one of which destroyed a two-story home and killed four people. Additional rains, ranging from 30 to 200 mm (1.2 to 7.9 in), fell in parts of Fujian and Zhejiang Provinces in China. No known damage resulted from the rainfall in China.
