= John Bibby =

John Bibby may refer to:

- John Bibby (businessman) (1775–1840), founder of the British Bibby Line shipping company
- John Bibby (ship), an 1841 ship
- John Roland Bibby (1917–1997), Northumbrian-born scholar, poet, writer, historian and antiquarian
- John S. Bibby (born 1935), British geologist
