= Bibby (disambiguation) =

Bibby is a surname.

Bibby may also refer to:

- Bibby Island, Nunavut, Canada
- Bibby Point, James Ross Island, Antarctica
- Bibby Line, a British shipping company
  - Bibby Financial Services, a multinational corporation and subsidiary of the Bibby Line Group

== See also ==
- Sabal bermudana, commonly known as the Bermuda Palmetto or Bibby-tree, or an alcoholic drink made from its sap
