= List of storms named Seniang =

The name Seniang has been used for twelve tropical cyclones in the Philippine Area of Responsibility by PAGASA and its predecessor, the Philippine Weather Bureau, in the Western Pacific Ocean.

- Typhoon Ida (1964) (T6412, 15W, Seniang) – struck the Philippines and China, killing 75 people.
- Typhoon Nina (1968) (T6826, 31W, Seniang)
- Tropical Depression Seniang (1972)
- Typhoon Hope (1976) (T7619, 19W, Seniang)
- Tropical Depression Seniang (1980)
- Tropical Depression Seniang (1984)
- Typhoon Odessa (1988) (T8826, 21W, Seniang)
- Typhoon Gay (1992) (T9231, 31W, Seniang) – long-lived Category 5 super typhoon that affected the Marshall Islands and struck Guam.
- Tropical Storm Beth (1996) (T9622, 32W, Seniang) – struck Luzon and then made landfall in Vietnam.
- Tropical Storm Bebinca (2000) (T0021, 31W, Seniang) – struck the Philippines.

Preceded by Reming	Pacific typhoon season names Seniang	Succeeded by Toyang

The PAGASA released a revised, modern naming list for tropical cyclones in 2001; the name Seniang was originally excluded, but eventually replaced Sibasib which went unused in 2002.

- Typhoon Utor (2006) (T0622, 25W, Seniang) – struck the Philippines.
- Tropical Storm Jangmi (2014) (T1423, 23W, Seniang) – struck the Philippines, causing the deaths of 66 people and ₱1.27 billion in damages.

The name Seniang was retired following the 2014 Pacific typhoon season and was replaced with Samuel.
