= MV Kowloon Bridge =

British oil combination carrier

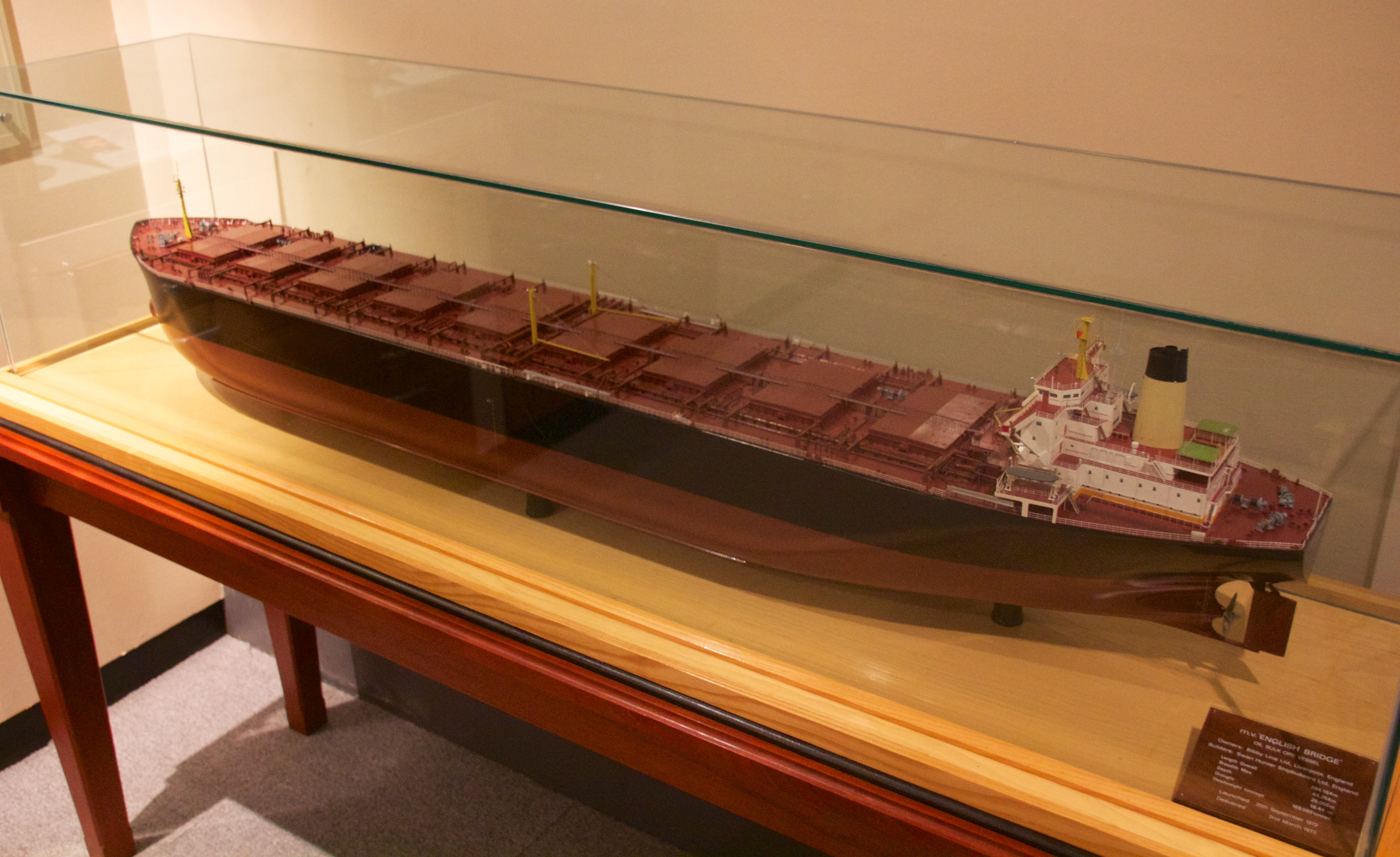
- Model of English Bridge

History
- Name: English Bridge (1973–1977); Worcestershire (1977–1979); Sunshine (1979–1980); Murcurio (1980–1983); Crystal Transporter (1983–1984); Kowloon Bridge (1984–1986)
- Owner: Bibby Line (1973–1979); Amroth Investments (1979–??); Helinger (19??–1986)
- Port of registry: Hong Kong
- Builder: Swan Hunter
- Launched: 25 September 1972
- Identification: IMO number: 7227932
- Fate: Sank in December 1986, wreck located 51°28′N 09°14′W

General characteristics
- Class & type: Bridge-class combination carrier
- Tonnage: 89,438 GT
- Length: 294.2 m (965 ft 3 in)
- Beam: 44.3 m (145 ft 4 in)
- Draft: 18.44 m (60 ft 6 in)
- Ice class: A1
- Installed power: B&W 8K98FF
- Propulsion: 1 x propeller
- Speed: 15.5 knots (28.7 km/h; 17.8 mph)
- Crew: 28

MV Kowloon Bridge was a Bridge-class ore-bulk-oil combination carrier built by Swan Hunter in 1973. She sank off the coast of Ireland in December 1986.

== History ==
The MV Kowloon Bridge was built on the River Tees by Swan Hunter for the Bibby Line and originally named English Bridge. In 1977, the vessel was renamed Worcestershire, as the fourth vessel to carry that name in the Bibby Line fleet. In 1979, the vessel was sold to Amroth Investments and renamed Sunshine.

The vessel was renamed a further three times, before then becoming known as Kowloon Bridge. The vessel's last voyage was between Sept-Îles, Quebec, Canada, headed for the River Clyde with a cargo of iron ore and oil.

On 20 November 1986, she anchored in Bantry Bay, Ireland, after developing deck cracking in one of her frames during her Atlantic crossing. After losing her anchor and damaging her steering gear, she was forced to leave port to avoid colliding with an oil tanker also anchored in Bantry Bay. Royal Air Force helicopters rescued the crew and the Kowloon Bridge was effectively abandoned with her engine running astern, heading away from the Irish coast. A tugboat that tried to reach her had to abandon the salvage attempt after she too sustained storm damage. The wind turned her around and she headed back towards the coast, nearly entering Baltimore Bay when her propeller hit the rocks, stalling the engine. Within hours, Kowloon Bridge drifted east and ran aground on a submerged reef near The Stags rocks off West Cork in the Republic of Ireland. The resulting fuel spill spread out over the Irish coastline causing extensive damage to local wildlife, and financial losses for the local fishing fleet. In the spring of 1987, Kowloon Bridge split into three sections and sank.

== Consequences ==
The Oireachtas passed the Oil Pollution of the Sea (Civil Liability and Compensation) Act 1988 to remedy legal problems in assessing the right to receive compensation for the pollution and the liability to pay for the cleanup. The Sea Pollution Act 1991 was also informed by the incident. However, the International Convention on Civil Liability for Oil Pollution Damage ratified by the 1988 act applied to cargo fuel from oil tankers but not bunker fuel from vessels like Kowloon Bridge, so by 1998 the state had not been recompensed for the cleanup.

The fate of the Kowloon Bridge increased pre-existing suspicion that similar structural defects might have played a part in the loss of her sister ship, the MV Derbyshire, during Typhoon Orchid in 1980, so that a formal investigation was held in 1987–88, and another in 1994.

The site is popular for wreck diving.
