= Bibby Financial Services =

- Company type: Subsidiary
- Industry: Financial services
- Founded: 1982
- Headquarters: Banbury, England
- Key people: Jonathan Andrew (CEO)
- Products: Factoring, Trade Finance, Corporate Finance
- Number of employees: 1,000
- Parent: Bibby Line Group
- Website: www.bibbyfinancialservices.com

Bibby Financial Services (BFS) is a multinational corporation that provides financial services to small and medium-sized enterprises (SMEs).

The company is a subsidiary of the Liverpool based Bibby Line Group, which was founded in 1807 by businessman, John Bibby. In the 1980s, the group diversified into financial services, haulage, retail, and private-equity-style investments in businesses. This helped it to survive and grow whilst local rivals, such as Cunard and White Star Line, disappeared or were absorbed by others. Bibby Line Group, today headed by the sixth generation of the Bibby family, is a £1.2 billion business, and operates in more than 20 countries, employing over 4,500 people in industries including retail, offshore, financial services, distribution, shipping, marine-based businesses, and plant hire.

== History ==
Bibby Financial Services was founded in 1982 during Sir Derek Bibby's chairmanship of the Bibby Line Group, a post he held from 1969 until 1992.

For the first two years, BFS was operated from the Bibby Line Group accounts department, before becoming a separate business entity.

The company has a regional office network with its headquarters located in Banbury, Oxfordshire.

BFS has a network of offices across Asia and Europe, including, Singapore, the Netherlands, the Czech Republic, Slovakia, France, Germany, Poland, Ireland and the United Kingdom.

In 2020, BFS sold its North American business to eCapital.

== Services ==
Bibby Financial Services provides invoice finance, asset finance, trade finance and foreign exchange services to small and medium sized businesses across the world, helping them get money for a range of scenarios, including cash flow funding, new equipment purchase, growth and expansion, management buy-ins and buy-outs, and corporate restructuring.

Globally, BFS supports more than 8,800 business customers across multiple industry sectors. The business operates in Europe and Asia.

== Recent developments ==
In 2013, the business had a turnover of £170 million. In November 2015, Bibby Financial Services announced that it was committing over £770M in funding to UK enterprises following a successful refinancing deal.

In September 2020, BFS appointed Jonathan Andrew as Global CEO.

In October 2022, BFS announced its plans to launch a Marine Finance business to support the financing of ships and vessels as part of its new strategy.

The Financial Times reported that BFS had secured a £1 billion securitisation deal to boost SME lending in November 2022.

=== COVID-19 ===
In response to the COVID-19 pandemic, BFS restructured its business (including the sale of its North American business) which helped reduce the impact of the pandemic on the financial arm, as one of Liverpool's oldest firms.

== See also ==
- Bibby baronets
