= Bibby =

Bibby is a surname. Notable people with the surname include:

- Andrew Bibby (actor) (born 1980), Australian actor
- Bob Bibby (1925–1994), Australian football player
- Chloe Bibby (born 1998), Australian basketball player
- Colin Bibby (1948–2004), British ornithologist
- Cyril Bibby (1914–1987), British biologist, educator and early sexologist
- Dan Bibby (born 1991), English rugby player
- Edwin Bibby (1848–1905), English wrestler, first American heavyweight champion
- Enid Bibby (born 1951), British educator
- Geoffrey Bibby (1917–2001), Danish archaeologist
- Gillian Bibby (1945–2023), New Zealand composer, pianist, writer and teacher
- Harriet Bibby (born 1998), English actress
- Henry Bibby (born 1949), American basketball player, brother of Jim and father of Mike
- Hugh Bibby (born 1943), New Zealand geophysicist
- Ian Bibby (born 1986), British racing cyclist
- Jack Bibby (born 2001), English rugby league footballer
- Jake Bibby (born 1996), English rugby league footballer
- Jessica Bibby (born 1979), Australian basketball player
- Jim Bibby (1944–2010), American baseball player
- John Bibby (businessman) (1775–1840), founder of the British Bibby Line shipping company
- John Roland Bibby (1917–1997), British scholar, poet, writer, historian and antiquarian
- John S. Bibby (born 1935), British geologist
- Mary Ann Bibby (c. 1832–1910), New Zealand storekeeper
- Mike Bibby (born 1978), American basketball player
- Neil Bibby (born 1983), Scottish politician
- Reginald Bibby (born 1943), Canadian sociologist
- Thomas Bibby (1799–1863), Irish poet
- Tom Bibby, American politician
- three Bibby baronets
