= List of storms named Orchid =

The name Orchid has been used for five tropical cyclones in the Western Pacific Ocean.

- Typhoon Orchid (1980) (T8013, 19W, Toyang) – made landfall on Japan as a category 1 typhoon, responsible for the loss of MV Derbyshire
- Typhoon Orchid (1983) (T8322, 23W, Warling)
- Typhoon Orchid (1987) (T8701, 01W, Auring)
- Typhoon Orchid (1991) (T9124, 23W, Sendang)
- Typhoon Orchid (1994) (T9426, 28W, Aning)
