= John Bibby (ship) =

Ship built in 1841

The John Bibby was a ship which, despite having the name of the founder of the Bibby Line, was never in fact was owned by that line. She was built at Maryport by Kelsick Wood and launched in 1841.

She was full-rigged. Her first voyage was under Captain Snide from Liverpool to Canton. She was at Anjou in January 1842 and in September 1842 was again at Liverpool, loading for her second voyage, this time to Calcutta. She sailed from Saugor on 18 March 1843 and arrived at London on 2 August. Under the command of Capt. Thomas Oates, she arrived at Sydney from Liverpool on 6 December 1855. The John Bibby disappeared from Lloyd's Register of Shipping in 1856.
