= Tropical Storm Jangmi (2014) =

Pacific tropical storm in 2014

Tropical Storm Jangmi (Seniang)
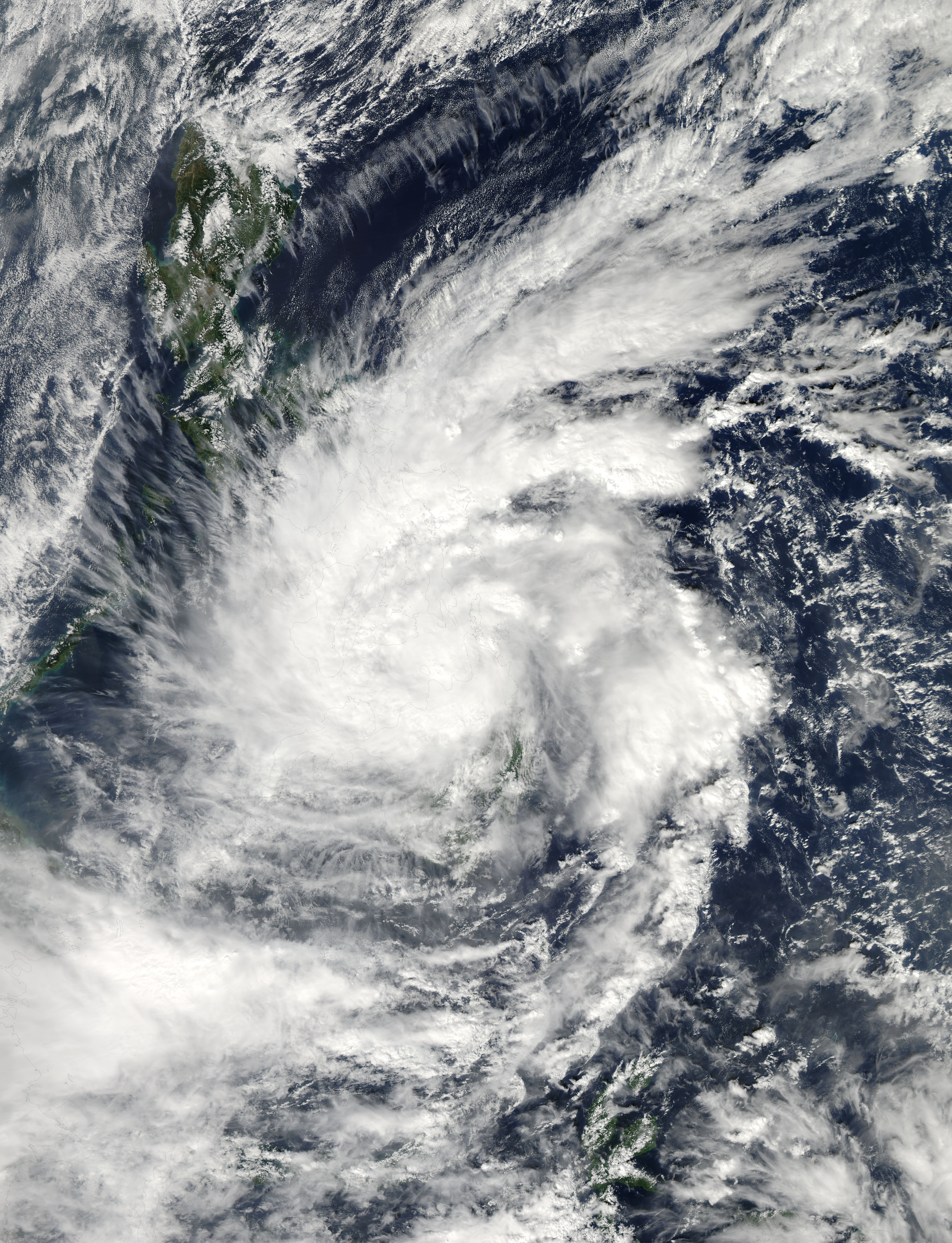
- Tropical Storm Jangmi over Mindanao on December 29

Meteorological history
- Formed: December 28, 2014
- Dissipated: January 1, 2015

Tropical storm
- 10-minute sustained (JMA)
- Highest winds: 75 km/h (45 mph)
- Lowest pressure: 996 hPa (mbar); 29.41 inHg

Tropical storm
- 1-minute sustained (SSHWS/JTWC)
- Highest winds: 85 km/h (50 mph)
- Lowest pressure: 989 hPa (mbar); 29.21 inHg

Overall effects
- Fatalities: 66
- Missing: 6
- Damage: $28.4 million (2014 USD)
- Areas affected: Philippines, Borneo
- IBTrACS /
- Part of the 2014 Pacific typhoon season

Tropical Storm Jangmi, (Note: The name Jangmi (Korean: 장미, [t͡ɕa̠ŋmi]) was contributed by South Korea and means rose in Korean.) known in the Philippines as Tropical Storm Seniang, was a weak but deadly tropical cyclone that impacted the south-central Philippines in late December 2014. Jangmi formed as a tropical depression on December 28 east of Mindanao. The system tracked west-northwest and soon became Tropical Storm Jangmi. Jangmi made landfall in Surigao del Sur later that day and traversed the northeastern Mindanao. The storm struck numerous islands in the Visayas begore emerged into the Sulu Sea on December 30 while turning southwestward. Environmental condition deteriorated, and Jangmi weakened to a tropical depression shortly afterwards. The system made landfall in northeastern Sabah on New Year's Day of 2015 and dissipated shortly afterwards.

Jangmi brought heavy rains to Mindanao and the Visayas which caused severe flooding and landslides. Many places recorded a total rainfall of over 10 in (250 mm) during the storm. Thousands of people were evacuated before Jangmi arrived. Leyte and Samar were heavily impacted by Jangmi, with landslides on these islands killed 32 people. 21 people were found dead in Bohol and Cebu due to drowning. Jangmi affected over 600,000 people in the Philippines, over 90% of the affected population were evacuated from their houses. The storm killed 66 people and 6 others were missing. Total damage amounted to 1.27 billion pesos (US$28.4 million).

== Meteorological history ==
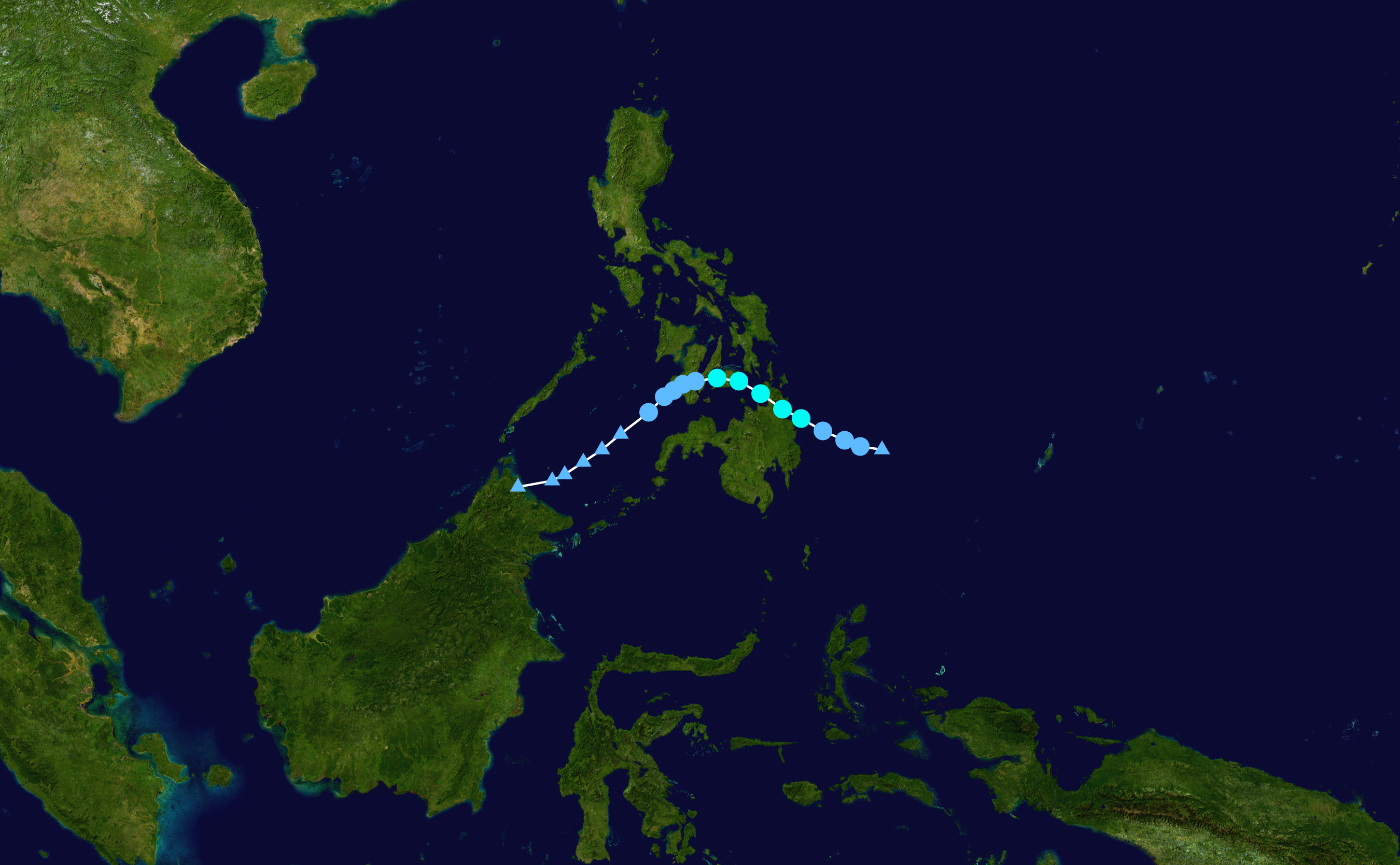
Map plotting the storm's track and intensity, according to the Saffir–Simpson scale Map key Saffir–Simpson scale Tropical depression (≤38 mph, ≤62 km/h) Tropical storm (39–73 mph, 63–118 km/h) Category 1 (74–95 mph, 119–153 km/h) Category 2 (96–110 mph, 154–177 km/h) Category 3 (111–129 mph, 178–208 km/h) Category 4 (130–156 mph, 209–251 km/h) Category 5 (≥157 mph, ≥252 km/h) Unknown Storm type Tropical cyclone Subtropical cyclone Extratropical cyclone, remnant low, tropical disturbance, or monsoon depression

On December 27, 2014, the Joint Typhoon Warning Center (JTWC) noted a tropical disturbance formed about 630 km (390 mi) west of Palau. The center was consolidating, though the convection was limited in the northern part. Good poleward outflow and low wind shear favoured further development. Later that day, the center became well-defined and convection persisted over the southern part while moving west-northwest, which prompted the JTWC to issue a TCFA for the system. At 00:00 UTC, the Japan Meteorological Agency (JMA) classified the system as a tropical depression, the JTWC followed suit three hours later, and designated it as 23W. Later that day, the PAGASA began monitoring the system and assigned a local name Seniang. Convection began to wrap into the center, though the center was partly exposed, and most of the convection was over the southwestern part. It continued to move west-northwest along the southwestern edge of a subtropical ridge. At 12:00 UTC, the JMA upgraded it to a tropical storm and assigned the name Jangmi. The convection increased over the center, and the JTWC also upgraded it to a tropical storm later that day.

At 3:45 a.m. PST December 29 (19:45 UTC December 28), Jamgmi made landfall in Hinatuan, Surigao del Sur. SSMIS revealed that Jangmi developed an eye-like feature over the Bohol Sea. Jamgmi made another landfall in Anda, Bohol at 9:30 p.m. (13;30 UTC) on December 29. Despite convection weakened after landfall, the center became better defined while convection wrapped more tightly. At 4:45 a.m. PST December 30 (20:45 UTC December 29), Jangmi made the third landfall in Sibonga, Cebu, and the fourth landfall in Guihulngan, Negros Oriental at 7 a.m. PST (23:00 UTC). On December 30, Jangmi emerged into the Sulu Sea and turned southwest. Jangmi became disorganized after crossing the Visayas. The JMA downgraded it to a tropical depression at 12:00 UTC, while the JTWC followed suit three hours later. Early on December 31, both the JTWC and the PAGASA issued the final advisory on Jangmi, as the center was completely exposed due to strong wind shear and the convection nearby weakened. However, the JMA continued to track the system. Jangmi crossed the coast of northeastern Sabah near Terusan on January 1, 2015 and dissipated shortly afterwards.

== Preparations and impact ==
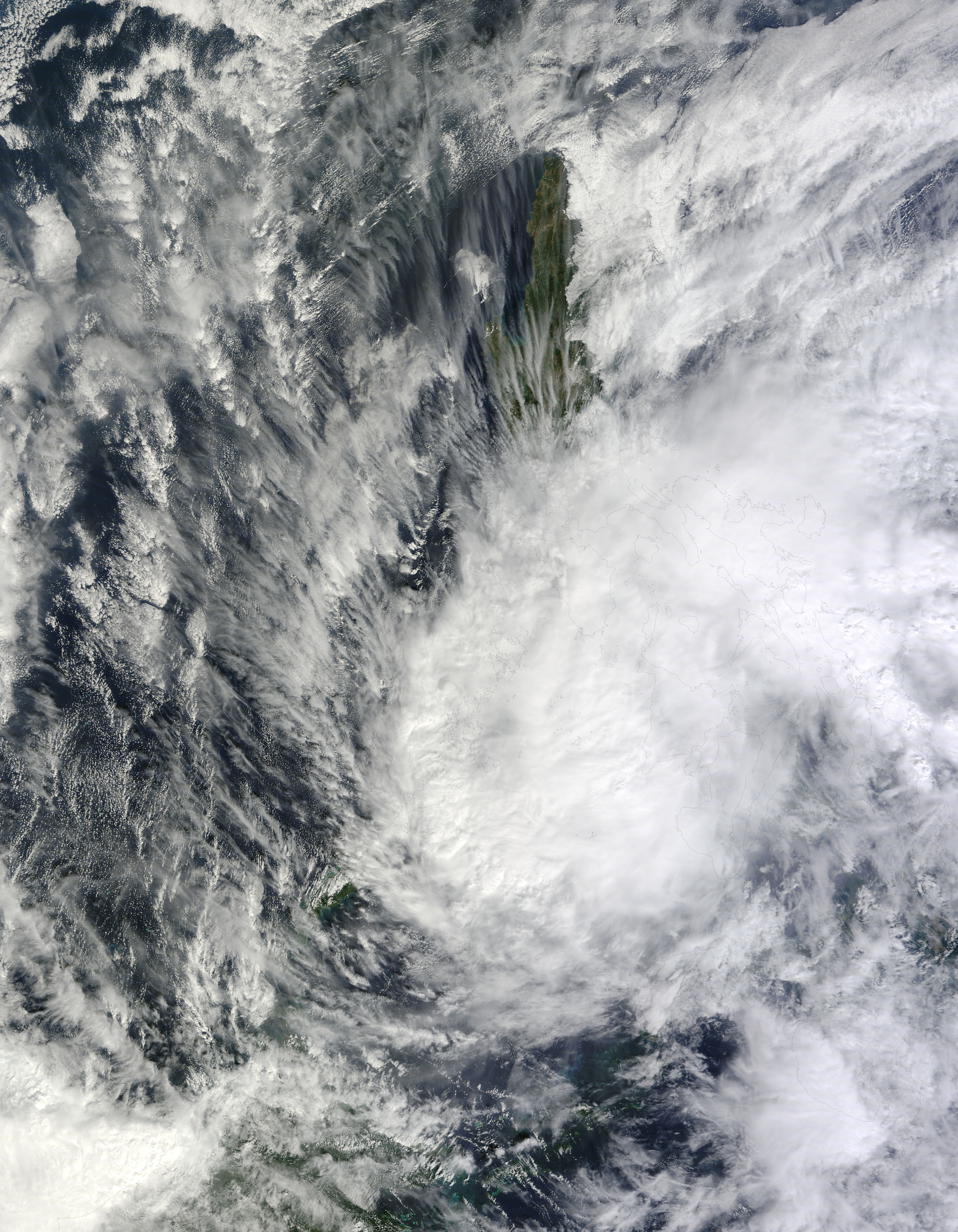
Tropical Storm Jangmi over Negros on December 30

Shortly after strengthened to a tropical depression, the PAGASA issued a PSWS #1 for provinces in Caraga, Davao Region and Northern Mindanao. As Jangmi approached the country, the PSWS #1 extended to Zamboanga del Norte, Leyte Island and Central Visayas. The PAGASA issued the PSWS #2 for provinces in Caraga, northern Mindanao and Bohol early on December 29 as Jangmi strengthened to a tropical storm. The PSWS #2 extended to southern Cebu, southern Negros Occidental while the PSWS #1 extended to southern Iloilo. All the PSWS were cancelled as Jangmi weakened to a low-pressure area. The MIAA cancelled 44 domestic flights on December 29 and cancelled another 14 on December 30. Sea transport in Surigao del Norte and Cebu were cancelled. 13,473 people were stranded in various ports across the country. Although Jangmi struck the Philippines during the Christmas holidays, classes of a high school in Nabua, Camarines Sur were still suspended, as the school remained flooded.

Jangmi brought heavy rains to south-central Philippines. In Hinatuan, where the storm made lanfall, recorded a total rainfall of 585 mm (23.04 in). Various places in northeastern Mindanao and Samar recorded a total rainfall of over 250 mm (10 in). Floodwaters of 1.5 m (5 ft) inundated some areas in Surigao del Sur. 14,000 people were evacuated in the province. Citizens in Veruela were forced to evacuated due to the floods. Flooding occurred Tago, San Miguel, Surigao del Sur, Butuan, Agusan del Norte and Cagayan de Oro. A bridge connecting Cagwait and San Agustin, Surigao del Sur were damaged. 33 families in Nabunturan and Compostela, Compostela Valley were evacuated due to the floods. In Monkayo, a landslide displaced 71 people and damaged 19 houses, though no casualties were reported. Flooding also occurred in Lanao del Sur. At least 15 towns in Misamis Oriental were affected by flooding. Over 1,500 families were evacuated to flee the flooding. The floods trapped 60 climbers in Claveria, and they needed to wait overnight until floodwaters retreated. 15 workers in Tagoloan were also trapped.

Jangmi also brought huge impacts to Visayas. Landslides hit Mahaplag, Baybay, and Tanauan, Leyte, resulting in ten deaths. Another landslide struck Catbalogan, Samar and killed 20 people. The flood situation in Bohol was worse than expected. The governor Edgar Chatto said that the river overflew its banks, inundated roads, damaged bridges and stalled lots of vehicles. Floodwaters in some regions were neck-depth. Two teenager boys in Loon died because of electroduction. Jangmi also triggered severe flooding in Cebu. Ten people were killed in Ronda and nine others were missing. In Sibonga, flooding washed away six houses and killed an elderly woman. The towns also reported a brownout. Other cities and towns such as Carcar, Argao, and Dumanjug were also flooded, which damaged vehicles and uprooted coconut trees. Over 16 cities and towns in Negros Occidental were being flooded. More than 13,000 families in the province were affected, including 200 families in Bacolod. In all, Jangmi killed 66 people, injured 43 and left six others missing. 602,627 people were affected throughout the Philippines, in which 549,035 of them were evacuated. A total of 3,523 houses were damaged, in which 654 of them were destroyed. Total damage caused by the storm reached ₱1.27 billion (US$28.4 million).

== Aftermath ==
Between December 29 to 31, 2014, the province of Agusan del Sur, Bohol and Misamis Oriental declared a state of calamity, while Asuncion, Davao del Norte, Butuan, Agusan del Norte, Himamaylan and San Enrique, Negros Occidental were under a state of calamity. On January 1, 2015, Ronda, Dumanjug and Alcantara, Cebu also declared a state of calamity. The DSWD allocated ₱37.5 million (US$840,000) as an assistance. The department distributed 42,289 food packs, 4,000 essential items, and ₱10,000 for the families of the fatalities of the landslides in Samar. The government of Cebu City allocated ₱1.8 million (US$40,000) for those who were affected by the storm in Cebu, while the government of Naga City allocated ₱100,000 for four cities or towns in Cebu. Besides, the government of Tagbilaran allocated ₱1 million (US$22,000) for the victims in Loboc. However, the mayor of Ronda Mariano Blanco III blamed that the DSWD didn't distribute any goods to the towns because they didn't receive any request.

On January 2, a landslide damaged two houses in Mandaue but no casualties were reported. Officials thought that heavy rains from Jangmi a few days ago could be a reason of the landslide.

== Retirement ==
Because the total cost of damage reached at least ₱1 billion, the name Seniang was retired by PAGASA and will never be used again as a typhoon name within Philippine Area of Responsibility (PAR). In February 2015, it was replaced by Samuel to replace Seniang for the 2018 season.

== See also ==
- Weather of 2014
- Tropical cyclones in 2014
- Other tropical cyclones named Jangmi
- Other tropical cyclones named Seniang
- Tropical Storm Washi (2011)
- Typhoon Bopha (2012)
- Tropical Storm Podul (2013)
- Tropical Depression Usman (2018)
- Tropical Storm Bolaven (2018)
- Typhoon Rai (2021)
- Tropical Storm Penha (2026)
