= Bibbi =

Bibbi is a given name and surname. Notable people with the name include:

- Bibbi Segerström (1943–2014), Swedish swimmer
- Gino Bibbi (1899–1999), Italian engineer and political activist

== See also ==
- Bibb (disambiguation)
- Bibby
