= Bibby Stockholm =

Accommodation vessel

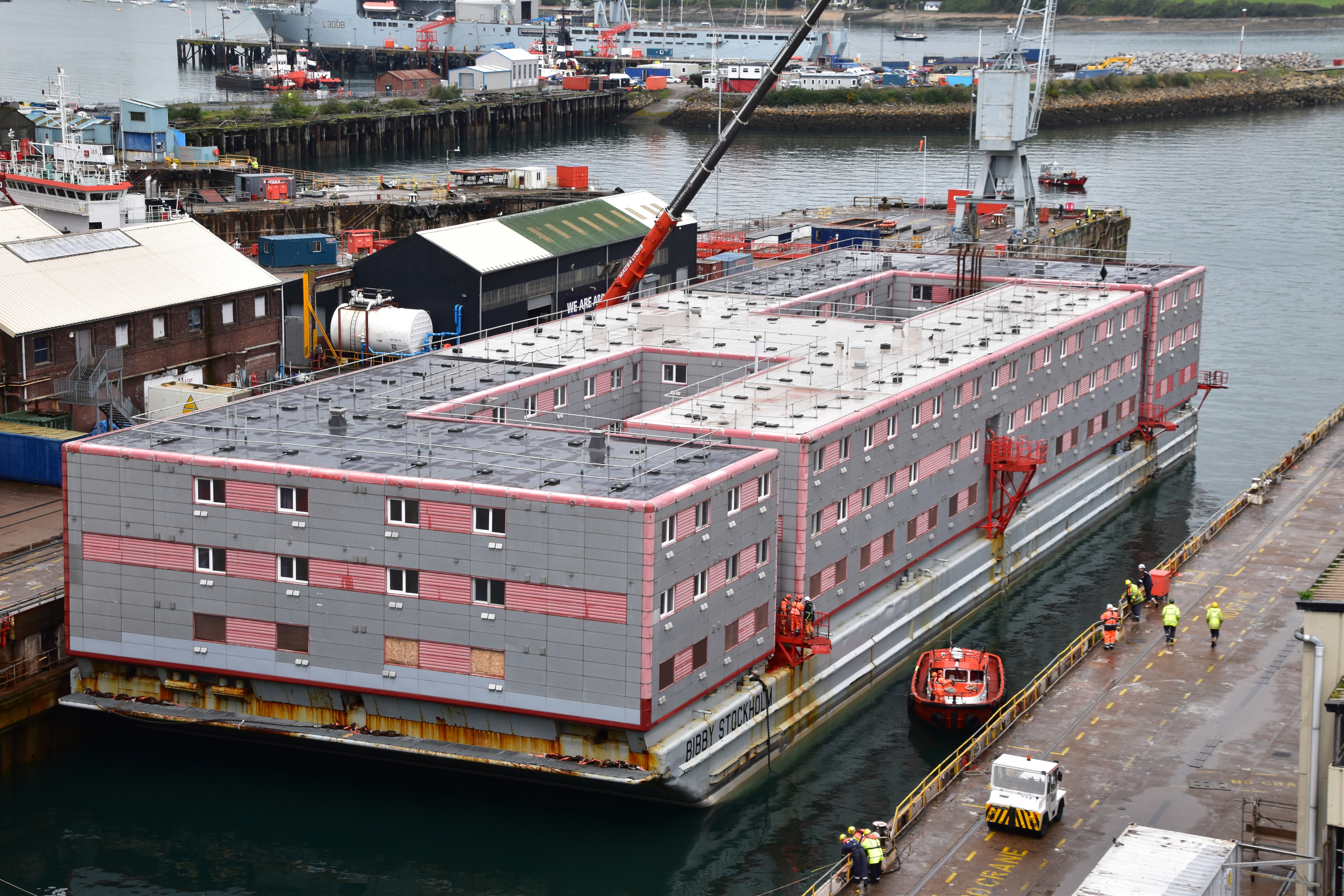
- Bibby Stockholm at Falmouth Docks in 2023

History
- Name: Bibby Stockholm
- Owner: Bibby Marine Ltd
- Port of registry: Bridgetown, Barbados
- Builder: Nederlandse Scheepsbouw
- Completed: 1976
- Identification: 8869476

General characteristics
- Type: Accommodation barge
- Tonnage: 10,659 tons
- Length: 93.44 m (306.6 ft)
- Beam: 27.43 m (90.0 ft)
- Draught: 2.2 m (7.2 ft)
- Decks: 3

Bibby Stockholm, an engineless barge, is an accommodation vessel owned by the shipping and marine operations company Bibby Line.

== History ==
The ship was built in 1976 and is flagged in Barbados. It was converted into an accommodation barge in 1992. It was formerly known as Floatel Stockholm and Dino I.

From 1994 to 1998, it was used to house the homeless, including some asylum seekers, in Hamburg, Germany. In 2005, it began to be used by the Netherlands to detain asylum seekers in Rotterdam.

In 2013, the barge was used by Petrofac as accommodation for construction workers at the Shetland Gas Plant. During this time, it was berthed at Lerwick, Scotland. In 2015, a man from Saltcoats, Ayrshire called Her Majesty's Coastguard to report that two bombs had been planted on barges: the accommodation ship Gemini, and the Bibby Stockholm. He admitted a charge of threatening or abusive behaviour and was sentenced to a six-month tagging order. The barge was finally towed away from Lerwick by the Cypriot tug Mustang on 31 May 2017, although it had been unused for over a year. It was subsequently towed to the Danish island of Bornholm.

In August 2017, there was discussion by a property management company about leasing the barge to provide university accommodation to 400 students in Galway, Ireland, along with the Bibby Bergen. However, the plan was generally not workable; the existing docks were not suitable, and the Supreme Court of Ireland had ruled that such a use would require planning permission.

In June 2018, the barge was moved to Piteå, Sweden, to assist in the construction of Markbygden Wind Farm. It stayed there until at least 2019.

== UK asylum containment site ==
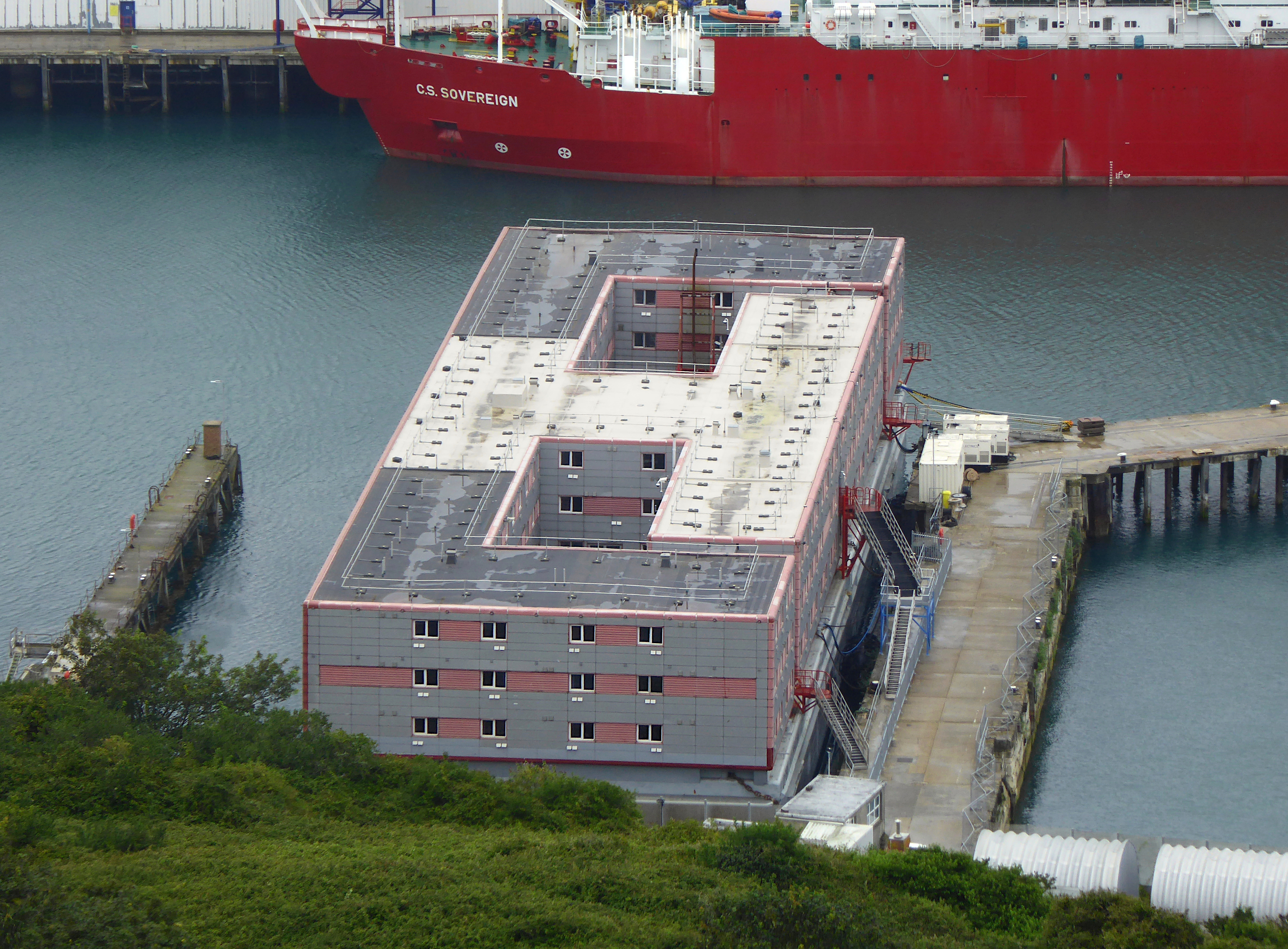
Bibby Stockholm at Portland Port in 2023.

In April 2023, the Barbados Maritime Ship Registry revealed the Government of the United Kingdom intended to use the Bibby Stockholm to house asylum seekers. The Government later confirmed it intended to bring the barge to Portland Port in Dorset, stating it would "offer better value for money for taxpayers than hotels", referring to the £5.6 million daily bill for accommodating asylum seekers in hotels. However, The Guardian reported in July 2023 that the barge may only have saved £10 per person per day.

The plan was for the three-storey barge to stay in the port for at least 18 months, containing 506 asylum applicants waiting for the outcome of Home Office decisions on their cases. The barge also contains healthcare provision, catering facilities, a multi-faith prayer room, a gym, and 24-hour security. The plans met with widespread opposition from various humanitarian organisations, the local South Dorset MP Richard Drax, and local authorities. Dorset Council explored legal action to prevent the barge from arriving. Nevertheless, the barge left dry dock in Falmouth on the morning of 17 July 2023 after several weeks' delay, and arrived at Portland Port the following morning.

In July 2023, an open letter signed by over fifty NGOs and campaigners, including the Refugee Council, called on the barge's owner, Bibby Marine, to acknowledge its founder John Bibby's links to the Atlantic slave trade and to end the practice of containing asylum seekers on its vessels. Later that month, a Financial Times investigation found the barge lacked fire exits and a Guardian report highlighted safety concerns, including potential overcrowding along with narrow corridors and a lack of lifejackets on board. The Times also reported there were concerns about fire safety. The Fire Brigades Union questioned how firefighters would be able to cross narrow corridors and put out fires on a barge with 500 people as desired by the government, when it had been retrofitted for 222 only. The Home Office said the barge would "adhere to all relevant health and safety standards".

On 7 August 2023, it was reported that the first group of 15 asylum-seekers had boarded the vessel, but a group of about 20 had refused to board. On the same day, Dorset Council told the barge's operators that Legionella bacteria had been confirmed on the barge. The asylum-seekers were evacuated a few days later, on 11 August.

On the same morning that the first asylum-seekers boarded the barge, Carralyn Parkes (the Mayor of Portland, but acting in a private capacity) wrote to the Home Secretary Suella Braverman to announce that she was seeking a judicial review to challenge the failure to obtain necessary planning permission to use the Bibby Stockholm barge at Portland Port. On 21 August, Parkes added the Marine Management Organisation as a co-defendant and informed Dorset Council that their continued failure to enforce planning rules over the barge would result in their also being named as co-defendants. On 27 August 2023, it was announced that the Fire Brigades Union had sent a pre-action protocol letter to the Home Office, warning of a legal challenge. According to the Guardian, the Home Office had failed to arrange fire drills for residents of the barge or adequate risk assessments of the vessel. In May 2024 the High Court of Justice ruled that the barge did not need planning permission, as it wasn't located on land.

There were several protests related to the project. On 19 October, three Just Stop Oil protesters were arrested after obstructing a coach moving migrants back on to the barge. On 24 and 25 April 2024, residents of Margate blocked two home office vans from moving 23 asylum seekers to the barge. On 2 May 2024, forty-five protesters were arrested after obstructing a coach moving asylum seekers in Peckham, London, on the way to the barge.

On 12 December 2023, it was reported that an asylum seeker housed in the barge by the Home Office had taken their own life.

On 27 December 2023 a report was published in error describing the use of the Bibby Stockholm as discriminatory on age and sex, although it noted that there were provisions in the Equality Act that might allow such discrimination.

The Bibby Stockholm's contract to hold asylum seekers expired in January 2025, after which it was not renewed. The final eight asylum seekers left the barge at the end of November 2024. The Bibby Stockholm was towed away from Portland 30 January 2025.

In 2026, Corporate Travel Management which ran the asylum barge recognised that it had overcharged the UK government £118 million, which it was negotiating commercial arrangements to refund.

== Current use ==
As of September 2025, the barge has been renamed Avon and is based in the Netherlands.

In its current configuration, the Avon has 222 cabins to accommodate up to 506 guests.

== See also ==
- English Channel migrant crossings (2018–present)
