= List of storms named Toyang =

The name Toyang has been used to name nine tropical cyclones in the Philippine Area of Responsibility by the PAGASA and its predecessor, the Philippine Weather Bureau, in the Western Pacific Ocean.

- Tropical Storm June (1964) (T6413, 13W, Toyang) – affected the Philippines and Hainan.
- Typhoon Ora (1968) (T6831, 31W, Toyang) – a category 4 equivalent typhoon that made landfall in the Philippines as a category 1 equivalent typhoon.
- Typhoon Pamela (1972) (T7226, 33W, Toyang) – struck Hong Kong as a category 3 equivalent typhoon, killing one person.
- Typhoon Iris (1976) (T7620, 24W, Toyang) – meandered over the South China Sea and struck South China.
- Typhoon Orchid (1980) (T8013, 19W, Toyang) – sank the MV Derbyshire.
- Typhoon Vanessa (1984) (T8422 26W, Toyang) – one of the most intense typhoons on record.
- Tropical Storm Pat (1988) (T8826, 48W, Toyang) – also affected the Philippines and Hainan.
- Tropical Storm Ernie (1996) (T9627, 37W, Toyang) – traversed the Philippines.
- Tropical Storm Rumbia (2000) (T0021, 48W, Toyang) – brought deadly flooding to the central and southern Philippines.

After the 2000 Pacific typhoon season, the PAGASA revised their naming lists, and the name Toyang was excluded.
