= Bridge-class OBO carrier =

Class of combination carrier ship

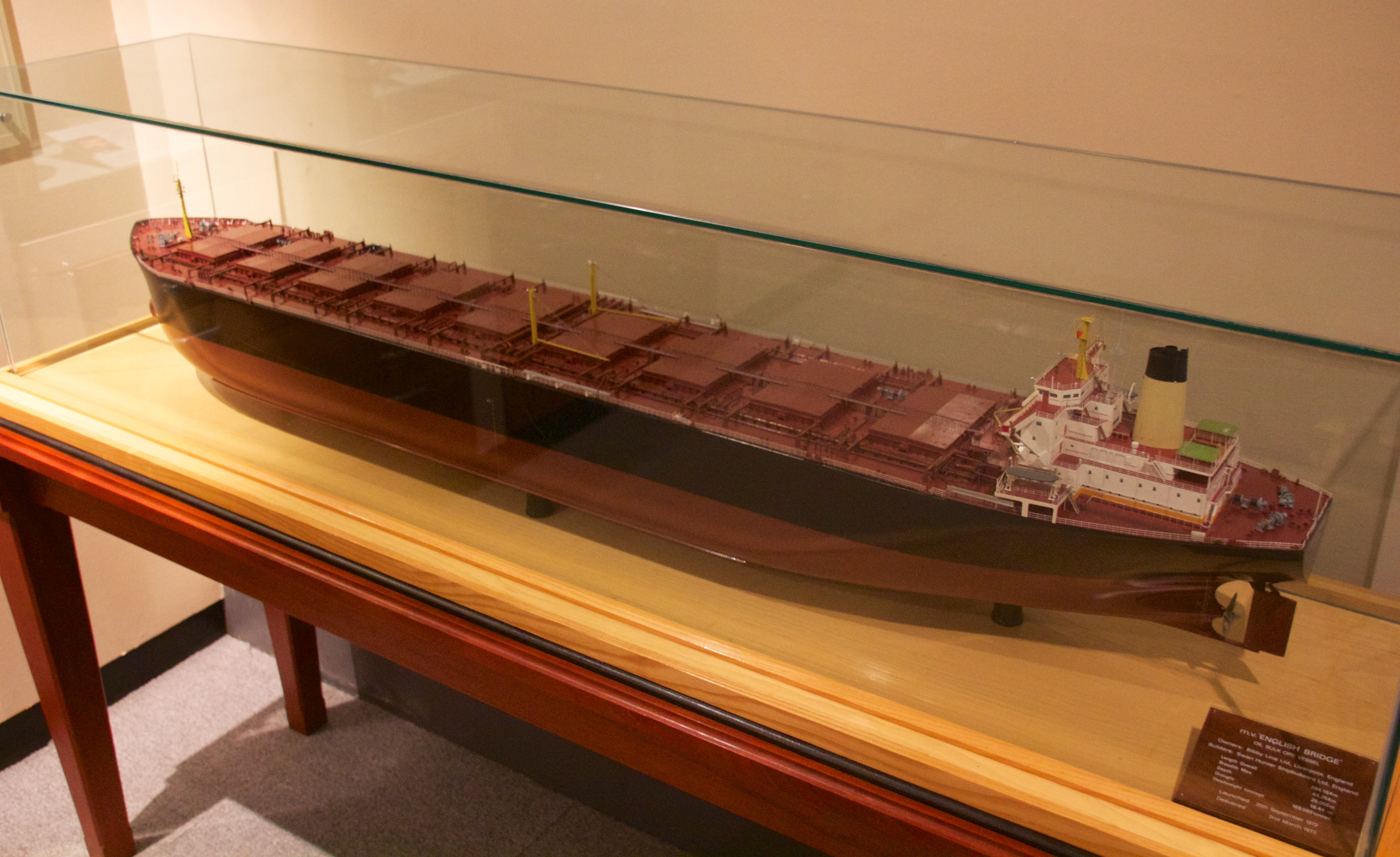
- Model of English Bridge, one of the ships in the class.

Class overview
- Name: Bridge class
- Builders: Swan Hunter
- Operators: Bibby Line (2); Furness Withy (1); Hilmar Reksten (2); Hunting Line (1)
- Built: 1971–1976
- In service: 1971–1997
- Completed: 6
- Lost: 2
- Retired: 4

General characteristics
- Type: Ore-bulk-oil carrier
- Tonnage: 77,316 GT–91,655 GT
- Length: 264–294.1 m (866 ft 2 in – 964 ft 11 in)
- Beam: 44 m (144 ft 4 in)
- Installed power: B&W 8K98FF
- Propulsion: 1 × propeller
- Speed: 15 knots (28 km/h; 17 mph)
- Capacity: Over 100,000 DWT of cargo
- Crew: 42

The Bridge-class was a series of six ore-bulk-oil vessels (also known as OBOs or "combination carriers") completed by Swan Hunter at their shipyard on the River Tees between 1971 and 1976. The vessels were built for four different shipowners, for operation by the Seabridge consortium, hence their "Bridge" names.

== History ==
Seabridge Shipping was a consortium of British shipowners, founded in the late 1960s to harness economies of scale to secure major bulk cargo contracts. Four members of the consortium - Bibby Line, Furness Withy, Hunting & Son and Thornhope Shipping (controlled by Hilmar Reksten, Norway) - ordered the six Bridge-class OBOs for charter to Seabridge. The ships were designed by Swan Hunter Shipbuilders, which had acquired the former Furness Shipbuilding Company yard at Haverton Hill on the River Tees in 1968.

The first vessel, Furness Bridge, was launched in 1971, and the others followed at annual intervals. Tyne Bridge was next in 1972, then English Bridge (later Kowloon Bridge) in 1973, Sir John Hunter in 1974, Sir Alexander Glen in 1975, and finally Liverpool Bridge (later Derbyshire) in 1976.

Whilst in commercial service, two of the six Bridge-class vessels sank: Derbyshire in 1980 and Kowloon Bridge in 1986. Between 1982 and 1997, the remaining four vessels were scrapped, the longest surviving vessel being Kona (ex. Sir John Hunter).

== Design ==
As built, all of the ships of the class suffered from deck plating cracks that would appear in front of the bridge after severe weather.

== Vessels ==
=== Furness Bridge ===
MV Furness Bridge (77,316 GT, 1971) was the first vessel of the class and built for Furness Withy. Whilst in service the vessel carried a number of different names - Lake Arrowhead, Marcona Pathfinder, World Pathfinder and finally Ocean Sovereign. The vessel was scrapped in 1992. Furness Bridge was the only vessel of the class built to the original design.

=== Tyne Bridge ===
MV Tyne Bridge (91,084 GRT, 166,000 DWT est., 1972) was built for Hunting and Sons Ltd., of Newcastle-Upon-Tyne. The vessel suffered several major incidents during her lifespan, including an engine room fire in South America when almost new and a major explosion of number eight cargo hold in the Sea of Japan several years later. The latter followed the striking of an iceberg in the Strait of Belle Isle on a voyage from Immingham in the UK to Sept-Îles, Quebec in Canada, which caused severe damage to her bulbous bow, fore-peak and fore-deep tanks. Later renamed East Bridge before being scrapped in 1987.

=== English Bridge ===
MV English Bridge (78,527 GT, 1973) was built for Bibby Line. The vessel was renamed Worcestershire in 1977 and sold a year later. The vessel was renamed Sunshine, Murcurio, Crystal Transporter and finally Kowloon Bridge. In 1986, Kowloon Bridge lost its rudder in heavy weather conditions off West Cork, Ireland and later sank after breaking its back.

=== Sir John Hunter ===
MV Sir John Hunter (88,404 GT, 1974) was built for Hilmar Reksten. Renamed Nordic Challenger, Cast Kittiwake, Kona, El Caribe, Sam Hunt and Nafsika when in service. The vessel was scrapped in 1997.

=== Sir Alexander Glen ===
MV Sir Alexander Glen (89,423 GT, 1975) was also built for Hilmar Reksten. Renamed Ocean Monarch in 1989 and again renamed Ocean Mandarin before being scrapped in 1995.

=== Liverpool Bridge ===
MV Liverpool Bridge (91,655 GT, 1976) was the last vessel in the class and also the largest. It was also built for Bibby Line. It was badly damaged in an explosion and renamed Derbyshire in 1978 before being lost in Typhoon Orchid off of Japan in 1980 with the loss of all 44 crew members on board.
