= MV Derbyshire =

British oil combination carrier

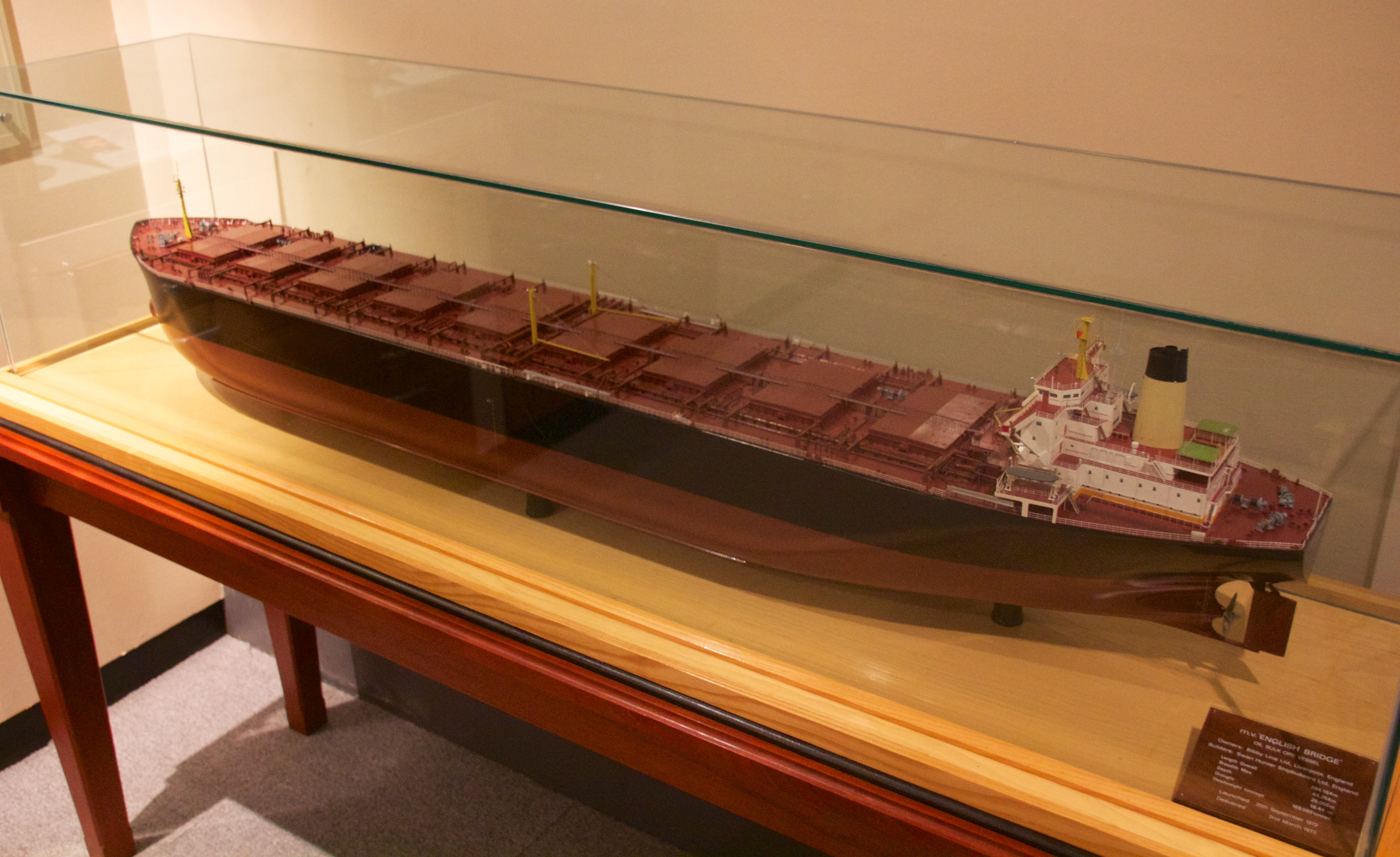
- Model of Derbyshire's sister ship, English Bridge

History

United Kingdom
- Name: Liverpool Bridge (1975–1978); Derbyshire (1978–1980)
- Owner: Bibby Line
- Port of registry: (United Kingdom) Liverpool
- Builder: Swan Hunter
- Yard number: 57
- Launched: 5 December 1975
- Completed: June 1976
- Identification: IMO number: 7343805 Call sign: GULK
- Fate: Lost with all hands on September 9 1980 during Typhoon Orchid.
- Notes: Largest British ship ever lost at sea

General characteristics
- Class & type: Bridge-class combination carrier
- Tonnage: 91,655 GRT; 67,429 NRT; 169,044 DWT
- Length: 294.2 m (965 ft 3 in)
- Beam: 44.3 m (145 ft 4 in)
- Draft: 18.44 m (60 ft 6 in)
- Ice class: A1
- Installed power: B&W 8K98FF
- Propulsion: 1 × propeller
- Speed: 15.5 knots (28.7 km/h; 17.8 mph)
- Capacity: ~160,000 tonnes of cargo
- Crew: 42

MV Derbyshire, originally named Liverpool Bridge, was a British ore-bulk-oil combination carrier built in 1976 by Swan Hunter, as the last in the series of the Bridge-class sextet. She was registered at Liverpool and owned by Bibby Line.

Derbyshire was lost on 9 September 1980 during Typhoon Orchid, south of Japan. All 42 crew members and 2 of their wives were killed in the sinking. At 91,655 gross register tons, she is the largest British ship ever to have been lost at sea.

== History ==
MV Derbyshire was launched in late 1975 and entered service in June 1976, as the last ship of the Bridge-class combination carrier, originally named Liverpool Bridge. She and English Bridge (later Worcestershire and Kowloon Bridge) were built by the Seabridge Shipping Ltd. consortium for Bibby Line. The ship was laid up for two of its four years of service life.

In 1978, Liverpool Bridge was renamed Derbyshire, the fourth ship to carry the name in the company's fleet. On 11 July 1980, on what turned out to be the ship's final voyage, Derbyshire left Sept-Îles, Quebec, Canada, her destination being Kawasaki, Kanagawa Prefecture, Japan, though she foundered near Okinawa, in southern Japan. Derbyshire was carrying a cargo of 157,446 tonnes of iron ore.

On 9 September 1980, Derbyshire hove-to in Typhoon Orchid, some 230 miles (370 km) from Okinawa, and was overwhelmed by the tropical storm, killing all aboard. She never issued a mayday distress message. The ship had been following weather routing advice by Ocean Routes, a commercial weather routing company.

The search for Derbyshire began on 15 September 1980 and was called off six days later. When no trace of the vessel was found, it was declared lost. Six weeks after Derbyshire sank, one of the vessel's lifeboats was sighted by a Japanese tanker.

Derbyshire's sister ship Kowloon Bridge was lost off the coast of Ireland in 1986, following the observation of deck cracking, first discovered after an Atlantic crossing. In the wake of this second disaster, Nautilus International, the National Union of Rail, Maritime and Transport Workers and the International Transport Workers' Federation funded a new investigation, sought by relatives of the Derbyshire victims.

== Further investigation ==
In 1994, a deep-water search began. In June of that year, the wreck of Derbyshire was found at a depth of 4 kilometres (2.5 mi), spread over 1.3 kilometres (0.81 mi). A subsequent expedition spent over 40 days photographing and examining the debris field, looking for evidence of what sank the ship. Ultimately, it was determined that waves crashing over the bow of the ship had earlier sheared off the covers of small ventilation pipes near the bow. Over the next two days, seawater had entered through the exposed pipes into the forward section of the ship, causing the bow to slowly ride lower and lower in the water. Eventually, the bow was made vulnerable to the full force of the rough waves, which caused the massive hatch on the first cargo hold to buckle inward, allowing hundreds of tons of water to enter within seconds. As the ship started to sink, the second, then third hatches also failed, dragging the ship underwater. As the ship sank, the increasing water pressure caused the ship to be twisted and torn apart by implosion/explosion, a property of double-hulled ships in which the compression of the air between the hulls causes a secondary explosive decompression.

The formal forensic investigation concluded that the ship sank because of structural failure and absolved the crew of any responsibility. Most notably, the report determined the detailed sequence of events that led to the structural failure of the vessel. A third comprehensive analysis was subsequently done by Douglas Faulkner, professor of marine architecture and ocean engineering at the University of Glasgow. His 2001 report linked the loss of the Derbyshire with the emerging science on freak waves, concluding that the Derbyshire was almost certainly destroyed by a rogue wave.

Work by sailor and author Craig B. Smith in 2007 confirmed prior forensic work by Faulkner in 1998 and determined that the Derbyshire was exposed to a hydrostatic pressure of a "static head" of water of about 20 metres (66 ft) with a resultant static pressure of 201 kilopascals (29.2 psi). (Note: Equivalent to 20,500 kgf/m^{2} or 20.5 t/m^{2}.) This is in effect 20 metres (66 ft) of seawater (possibly a super rogue wave) (Note: The term super rogue wave had not yet been coined by ANU researchers at that time.) flowing over the vessel. The deck cargo hatches on the Derbyshire were determined to be the key point of failure when the rogue wave washed over the ship. The design of the hatches only allowed for a static pressure of less than 2 metres (6.6 ft) of water or 17.1 kilopascals (2.48 psi), (Note: Equivalent to 1,744 kgf/m^{2} or 1.7 t/m^{2}.) meaning that the typhoon load on the hatches was more than ten times the design load.

Fast-moving waves are now known to also exert extremely high dynamic pressure. It is known that plunging or breaking waves can cause short-lived impulse pressure spikes called "Gifle peaks". These can reach pressures of 200 kilopascals (29 psi) (or more) for milliseconds, which is sufficient pressure to lead to brittle fracture of mild steel. Evidence of failure by this mechanism was also found on the Derbyshire. Smith has documented scenarios where hydrodynamic pressure of up to 5,650 kilopascals (819 psi) or over 500 metric tonnes per square metre could occur. (Note: Equivalent to 576,100 kgf/m^{2} or 576.1 t/m^{2}.)

== Memorials ==
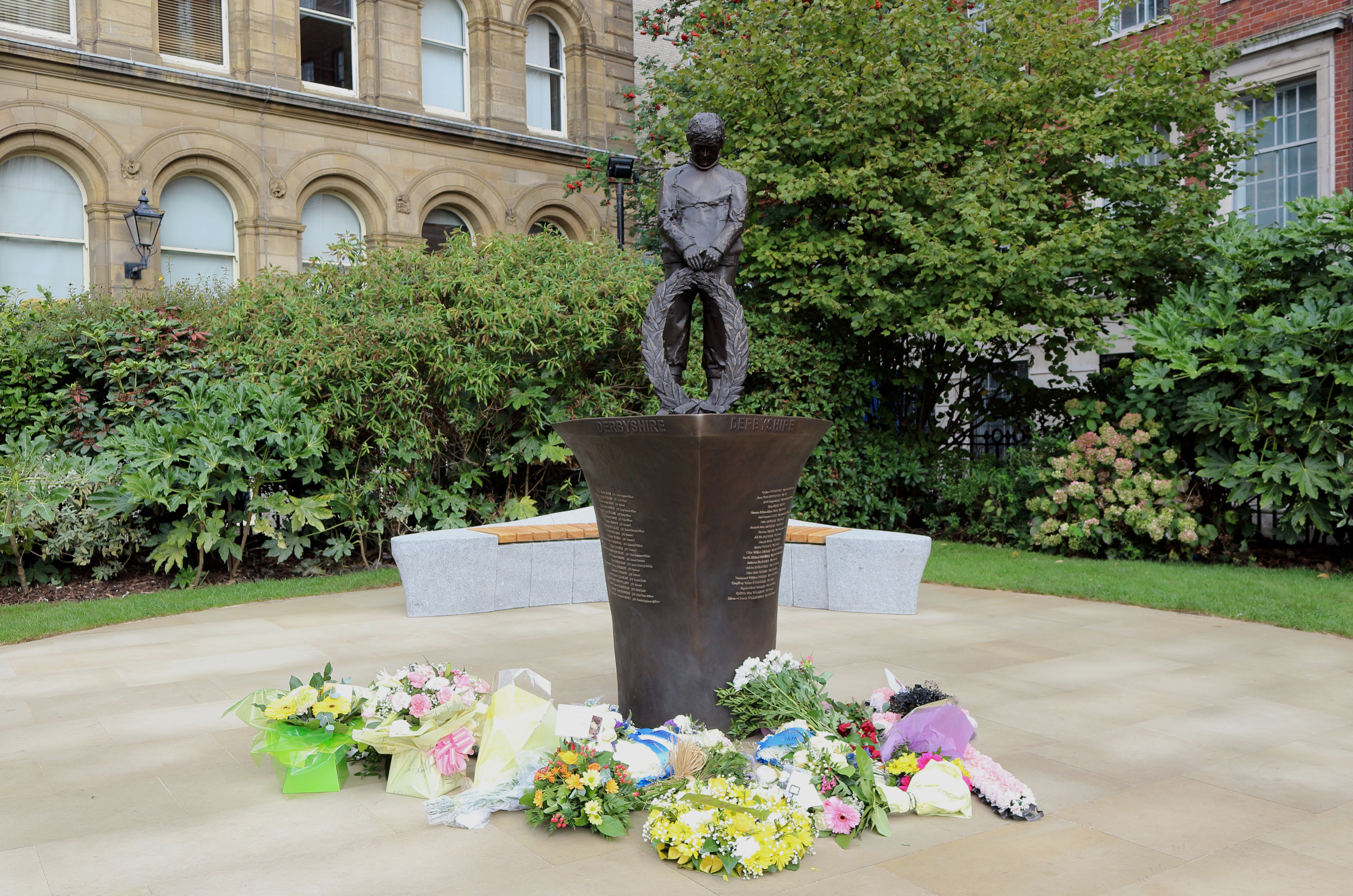
The memorial in Liverpool

A bronze plaque was placed on the wreckage as a memorial to those who were lost. On 21 September 1980, the Bibby Line vessel Cambridgeshire held a memorial service for Derbyshire in the area the vessel was lost.

The 20th anniversary of the vessel's loss was marked by a memorial service in Liverpool, England, which was attended by Deputy Prime Minister John Prescott, himself a former merchant seaman. Ten years later a memorial service was held in the vessel's home port of Liverpool on the 30th anniversary of Derbyshire's loss.

A permanent monument was dedicated on 15 September 2018 in the garden of the Church of Our Lady and Saint Nicholas, Liverpool.

== See also ==
- List of ship launches in 1976
- List of shipwrecks in 1980
- List of maritime disasters
- Edmund Fitzgerald, an American bulk carrier lost in 1975 under similar circumstances
