= Bob Bibby =

Australian rules footballer

Personal information
- Full name: Robert Samuel Bibby
- Born: 18 April 1925; Moonee Ponds, Victoria
- Died: 29 January 1994 (aged 68); Frankston, Victoria
- Original team: South Melbourne Tech
- Height: 179 cm (5 ft 10 in)
- Weight: 70 kg (154 lb)

Playing career^{1}
| Years | Club | Games (Goals) |
| 1944–47 | St Kilda | 32 (3) |
- ^{1} Playing statistics correct to the end of 1947.

Robert Samuel Bibby (18 April 1925 – 29 January 1994) was an Australian rules footballer who played with St Kilda in the Victorian Football League (VFL).
