= ECapital =

American finance company

eCapital
- Type: Private
- Industry: Commercial finance
- Founded: 2006; 20 years ago
- Founder: Steve McDonald
- Headquarters: Miami, Florida, U.S.
- Area served: United States, Canada, United Kingdom
- Key people: Marius Silvasan (CEO); Steve McDonald (President)
- Products: Freight factoring; invoice factoring; asset-based lending; payroll funding; healthcare receivables financing; lines of credit
- Number of employees: 700 (2024)
- Website: www.ecapital.com

eCapital, founded in 2006 and based in Miami, Florida, is a financial services company with operations spanning across Canada, the United Kingdom, and the United States. The company specializes in asset-based lending, freight factoring, invoice factoring, healthcare receivables financing, and payroll funding.

Marius Silvasan currently holds the position of chief executive officer.

== History ==
eCapital, originally established as Global Merchant Fund Corp. in 2006 by Steve McDonald, began its operations by acquiring underperforming loans from the Federal Deposit Insurance Corporation (FDIC), along with other banks and loan funds.

In 2017, Global Merchant Fund Corp. expanded by acquiring Gerber Finance, a company that finances importers, distributors, manufacturers, and service providers. The following year, 2018, saw the acquisition of Paragon Financial Group, a firm specializing in accounts receivable financing, credit protection, non-recourse invoice factoring, purchase order financing, and vendor guarantees.

In 2019, Global Merchant Fund Corporation acquired Accutrac Capital, a company active in freight factoring, a sub-sector of transportation market. Subsequently, through Accutrac Capital, the company acquired eCapital, a U.S.-based transportation factoring company.

In 2020, Global Merchant Fund Corp. underwent rebranding to become eCapital and consolidated its various acquisitions. In the same year, the acquisition of several companies: Advantedge Commercial Finance, a UK-based specialty lender and factoring company; Bibby Financial Services; REV Financial Group, based in Los Angeles; and Prosperity Funding, located in Fort Lauderdale occurred.

In November 2021, eCapital acquired Flexible Funding, payroll funding firm specializing in funding assistance for the staffing industry, and its subsidiary, InstaPay, that provides freight factoring services.

The company further expanded in 2022 with the acquisition of UMB Bank's accounts receivable financing division and a company called CNH Finance that was active in the healthcare sector. This led to the establishment of eCapital's Healthcare division, dedicated to healthcare industry clients.

eCapital operates within over 80 different sectors, including Transportation, Healthcare, Staffing, and Consumer Goods, among others. The company has also grown through acquisitions, incorporating twelve firms into its corporate structure.

== Industry applications ==
eCapital's financial services are aimed at small and medium-sized businesses in North America and the UK. These include eCapital Connect, a platform for managing financial transactions, alongside services like Invoice Factoring, Freight Factoring for transportation companies, and Factoring for commercial entities, Asset-based lending, healthcare receivables financing, and Payroll Funding specifically for staffing companies. Clients may also acquire VISA Commercial Cards and Fuel Discount Cards accessible via a mobile app on both iOS and Android platforms. Additionally, eCapital provides funding for high-growth companies, buyouts, mergers and acquisitions, extended payment terms, poor financial health situations, unexpected events, restructuring and turnaround scenarios, seasonal fluctuations, DIP financing, and startups.

== Management ==
- Marius Silvasan, the current Chief Executive Officer (CEO). He was formerly the CEO and director of ONE Bio Corp and a founder of Tele Plus World Corp.
- Steve McDonald, founder and current company President.
- Tony Howard (CCO)
- Tracy Groves (CMO)
- Mark Wilson (CTO)
- Peter Dahill (CFO)
- Tim Peters (President, Head of ABL Group)
- David Tilling, CEO, Head of UK Group

== Affiliations and other activities ==
eCapital is affiliated with several industry organizations including the Secured Finance Network and the International Factoring Association. eCapital also supports the American Staffing Association, Staffing Industry Analysts Association, Owner-Operator Independent Drivers Association (OOIDA), Women in Trucking Association, Colorado Trucking Association, Arkansas Trucking Association, the Orillia Chamber of Commerce, Turnaround Management Association, Secured Finance Network, American Factoring Association, and Association for Corporate Growth.

== Industry Reviews ==
eCapital previously underwent a review consolidation by the Truckers Report website. The outcomings from this review indicate the company's overall impression was negative as of 2014. Key issues highlighted include challenges with contract termination, difficulties in reclaiming escrow/reserve funds, delays in releasing UCCs, the complexity and mutability of web-based contracts, aggressive and misleading sales tactics, lack of customer support, poor communication, issues with fund releases and payments, and unauthorized factoring practices.

Another review by Benzinga, in 2022, provided more positive ratings for eCapital, particularly in the field of financial services, citing easy qualification requirements and fast approval of credit as among the advantage of availing the company's services. The site mentions eCapital as suited to companies that require quick access to cash, those in the midst of expansion, businesses recovering from challenging periods, entities aiming to acquire other companies, and firms favoring asset-based lending.

== Products and services ==
- Freight factoring, invoice factoring, healthcare receivables financing, asset-based lending, payroll funding.
