= Bibby Line =

UK shipping company

Coordinates: 53°24′5.9″N 2°58′51.3″W

- Type: Private
- Industry: Shipping
- Founded: 1807
- Headquarters: Liverpool, United Kingdom
- Key people: Jebb Kitchen (MD)
- Owner: Bibby Line Group Ltd
- Website: Bibby Line homepage

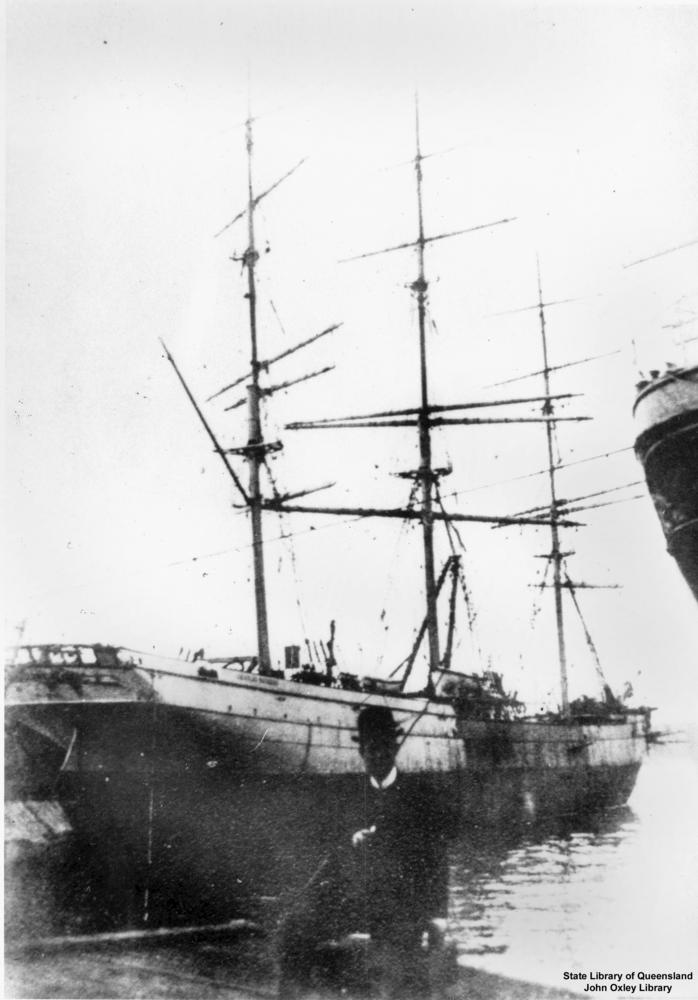
The Danube was a steam and sailing ship built for Bibby Line in 1856 and sold to Leyland Line in 1873

Bibby Line is a UK company concerned with shipping and marine operations.

Its parent company, Bibby Line Group Limited, can be traced back to John Bibby who founded the company in 1807. The company along with the group is based in Liverpool.

== History ==
House flags

1807-1926

1926-present

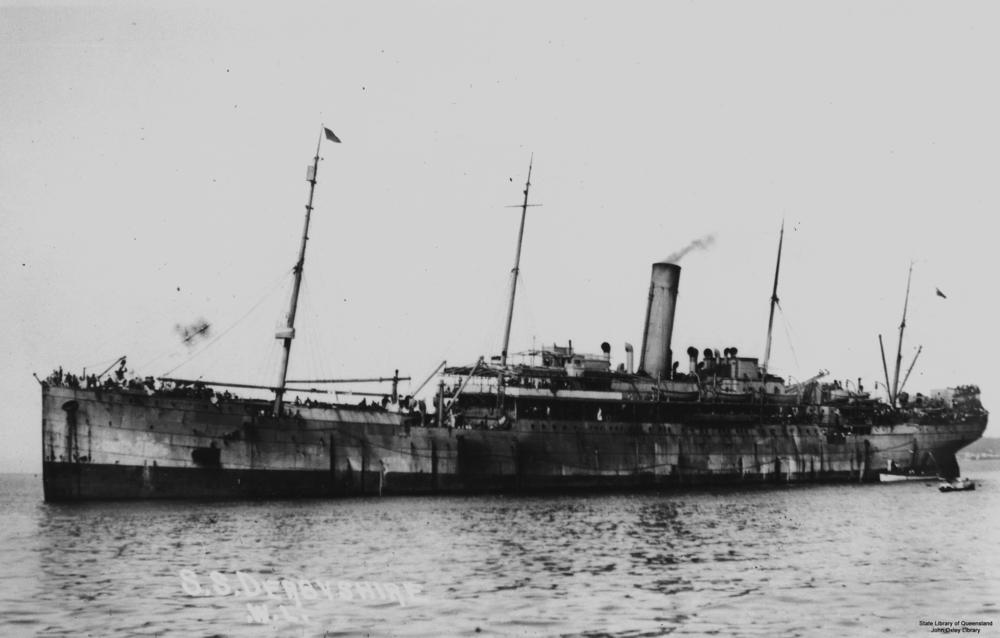
The cargo steamship Derbyshire was built by Harland and Wolff in 1897, survived the First World War and was scrapped in 1931

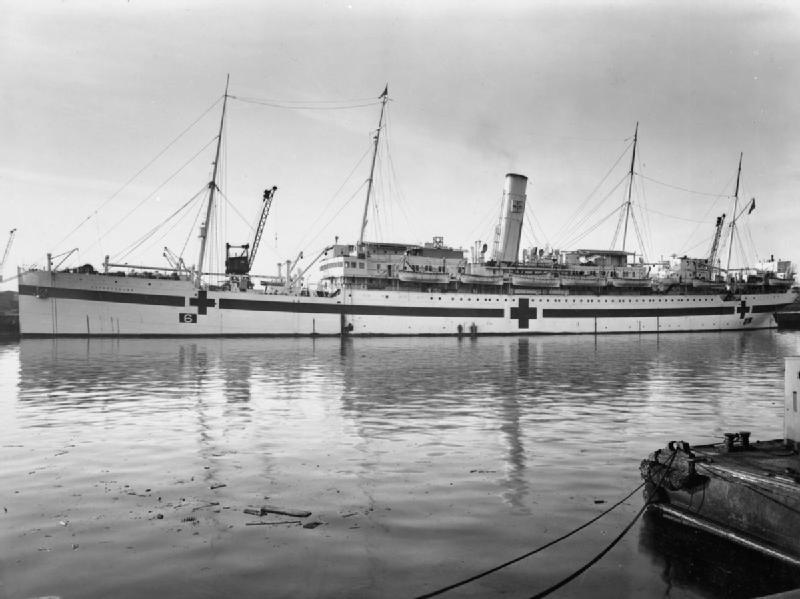
The Bibby Line passenger ship Oxfordshire, built in 1912, serving as a hospital ship in the Second World War

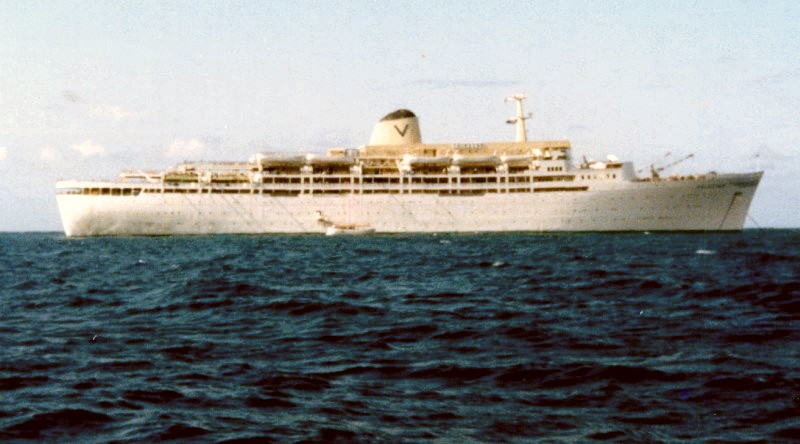
The cruise ship Fairstar, which was built in 1957 as the Bibby Line troopship Oxfordshire

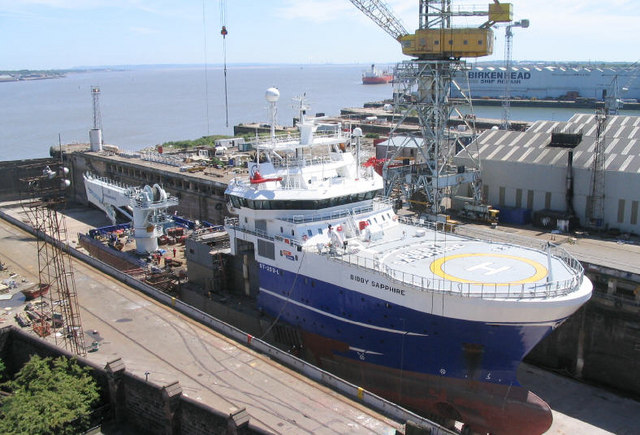
Bibby Sapphire is a diving support vessel built in 2005

The Bibby Line was founded in 1807 by the first John Bibby (1775–1840).

After John Bibby was attacked and murdered on 19 July 1840, his sons John and James took ownership of the Bibby Line.

It was one of the first businesses in the world to fit its entire fleet with radio, by the British based Radio Communication Company.

Along with other British ship owners, it endured hard economic conditions in the 1970s and 1980s, but survived through diversification into floating accommodation. The group diversified in the 1980s into separate divisions, including Bibby Financial Services which was formed in 1982. The parent company is now called Bibby Line Group, and is a £800 million global business, operating in 14 countries, employing 4,000 people in sectors including retail, financial services, distribution, shipping, marine and infrastructure.

Since 2007, Bibby Line Group and its employees have donated over £10 million and thousands of volunteering hours to over 1,000 charitable causes.

In 2008, the Bibby Line Group continued to diversify with the purchase of the construction asset hire company Garic UK. Bibby Line Group’s investment enabled Garic to remain a key market player, in a competitive sector. Currently, Garic has four sites across the UK and is one of the most trusted specialized plant and welfare facility providers in the UK.

In July 2023, an open letter signed by over fifty NGOs and campaigners, including the Refugee Council, called Bibby Marine, as owner of the Bibby Stockholm, to acknowledge its founder John Bibby's links to the Atlantic slave trade and to end the practice of containing asylum seekers on its vessels. Later that month, a Guardian report highlighted safety concerns on board the Bibby Stockholm, including potential overcrowding along with narrow corridors and a lack of lifejackets on board. The Times also reported there were concerns about fire safety, noting it could become 'a floating Grenfell'. On 11 August 2023 legionella was found to be on board and a water sample taken on 15 August 2023 confirmed this to be of 'the most deadly strain' of legionella pneumophila, found in the ship's kitchen's galley pot wash hose.

== Ships ==
Bibby Line has a fleet of accommodation barges and Service Operation Vessels.

=== Current fleet ===
Vessels currently operated by Bibby Line include:

- Bibby Sapphire Diving support vessel
- Bibby Stockholm Accommodation barge

=== Former fleet ===
Vessels that have previously operated for Bibby Line include:

- Brixham
- Cheshire - operated by Bibby Transport suffered a cargo fire in August 2017 off the coast of the Canary Islands during a passage from Norway to Thailand with a cargo of ammonium nitrate fertilizer. The cargo in all five of the ship’s cargo holds burned for two straight weeks. Shipping Watch reports that 'toxic gases had M/V Cheshire's cargo exploding and made it rain fertilizer'. In 2021 the Norwegian Court of Appeal upheld a ruling that crew negligence was a key factor in the loss of the Cheshire and ordered Bibby Transport and Singapore-based operator J. Lauritzen to pay compensation and costs totalling around US$30m. Safety4Sea reports: 'Ruling that Bibby and Lauritzen were liable to pay damages, the court said it had found evidence of a ‘negligent breach of clear and repeated instructions’ by the ship’s crew, who had failed to ensure that all heat sources in the cargo holds were disconnected before loading. The judgment further states that a light by a ladder in cargo hold 4 had probably been left on from the time of loading and, most likely, had not been disconnected until four days after that,– by which time the heat around the lamp had started the chemical reaction. "The instructions were to disconnect the power supply, not just to turn off the switches. That such disconnection probably only took place after four days is in itself clearly reprehensible," the court pointed out. The court also decided that the crew were negligent in failing to act more quickly when the first signs of problems with the cargo had been detected.'
- Derbyshire - Lost on 9 September 1980 during Typhoon Orchid with all 44 hands onboard. Largest British vessel ever lost at sea.
- Harlington
- Herefordshire - wrecked on Cardigan Island in 1934 while on the way to be scrapped
- Hertfordshire
- Kiel
- Kowloon Bridge
- Leicestershire - sold, renamed Heraklion and sunk in the Aegean Sea in 1966
- Oxfordshire (1912) - official number 131454, recorded travelling Liverpool - Marseilles - Port Said - Colombo - Rangoon, departing Liverpool 2 March 1923. [UK and Ireland, Outward Passenger Lists, 1890–1960, Liverpool, 2 March 1923]
- Oxfordshire (1957)
- Rmeil
- Shropshire
- Somersetshire
- Worcestershire
- Yorkshire - sunk by U-37 in September 1939 with the loss of 58 lives

== Current operations ==
As of 2023 the Bibby Line labels itself a diverse company which has three separate services split into: Financial Services, Marine Services, and infrastructure applications. These businesses within the Bibby line group, operate across multiple countries and currently it is recorded to employ 1300 colleagues. It is now recording management of 1 billion pounds in funds.

After suffering through COVID-19 and ultimately undertaking a restructuring it was recorded that generally after working at a net loss they were able to run more profitably. In reports sent to the Uk companies house it can be seen that on 31 December 2021, the group made a net profit of £35.5m, compared with a net loss of £29.9m in 2020.

=== Leadership ===
Generation	MD	Management tenure	Key events
First	John Bibby	1807–1840	Creation of the Bibby Line in 1807
			Built fleet of 18 vessels
			Established Mediterranean trade
			Some trade with Bombay and Canton
Second	James (son)	1840–1897	Fleet of 23 steam ships by 1865
			Association with Harland and Wolff
			James ‘retires’ in 1973
			James establishes limited liability company in 1890
			Separation of owners and managers
Third	Arthur (nephew of James)	1897–1935	Consolidates links with Burma
			Seven ships less than 10 years old in 1914
			Fleet requisitioned for World War I
			Post-war turbulence
			Focus on Burma trade
Fourth	Harold (Arthur's son)	1935–1965	Fleet requisitioned for World War II
			Decline of Far East trade
			Containerisation and air travel
Fifth	Derek (Harold's son)	1965–1985	Two bulk carriers from Japan in 1965
			Borrowed finance
			Oil shocks of 1970s
			Marine diversification
			Regained financial control
			Appointed Simon Sherrard MD
			Diversification into financial services and logistics
Sixth	Michael (Derek's son)	2000 to present	Continued diversification
			Rapid growth of the business

Since 1965 Bibby has come into its modern era of leadership with the fifth generation, Derek Bibby becoming MD. He led diversification into new areas specifically financial services and infrastructure applications. Following his retirement Simon Sherrard was appointed the first non-family managing director and helped continue to modernize and drive diversification before handing over to the sixth generation Michael Bibby in 2000. Since then Bibby Line has continued to rapidly grow and diversify further and Michael stepped back from managing director to chairman. Currently the board is composed of 5 members; Jonathan Lewis the Executive Director (Group Managing Director, ), and the Non-Executive Directors including: Sir Michael Bibby Bt. DL (Chairman), David Anderson (Senior Independent), Susan Searle, and Geoffrey Bibby.

=== Financial Services ===
Bibby Financial Services was set up in 1982, is seen to be the UK’s largest independent invoice finance company. It offers services providing factoring and invoice discounting financial support for growing SME's. Through It aims to "help businesses around the world grow, combining international scope with expert local knowledge". In a report released in 2023 it note that it employed 900 people and had expanded to nine different countries. After a restructuring of the company in 2020 turnover was reported to have increased by 2022 from £132.4m to £150.5m for 2022, while its pre-tax profits increased from £255,000 to £9.4m.

=== Marine Services ===
Bibby Marine Limited, established in 1982, currently has 1 "Wavemaster" that can operate up to 30 days at a time and 1 Bibby Challenge that contains 337 rooms known as the Bibby Stockholm. This has led to the current dominant trait of the Bibby Line fleet being the application of these vessels for "walk to work service" where special operations ships, "Wavemasters", can take off shore workers out to their remote locations. Part of this then also extends into floating off shore worker accommodation locations providing floating barges where workers can live on or off duty. These marine services aim to provide cost effective and environmentally friendly options for workers on large scale marine infrastructure projects. There have been large controversies with Bibby Stockholm which aims to provide support housing for asylum seekers. Claims of prison like conditions were leveled and according to the Financial Times, governments were only saving £9.28 per person per day.

=== Infrastructure ===
Existing for the last 30 years and employing 230 people, "Garic" has worked in the welfare and plant hire market. This is through the "hire and sell welfare accommodation, modular buildings, plant and storage products, tower lights, environmental solutions, wheel washing, dust control and site shelters". These can be set up, serviced and broken down by Garic and are generally aimed towards fields like construction, infrastructure, industrial, house building, water and waste, power, utilities and renewables and commercial property sectors. They have moved into sustainable sectors as is one of their goals as seen in an article where Garic promotes sustainable solutions to business growth on the ground.

== See also ==
- Bibby baronets
- Bibby Financial Services
