= Bibby baronets =

Baronetcy in the Baronetage of the United Kingdom

Escutcheon of the Bibby baronets of Tarporley

The Bibby Baronetcy, of Tarporley in the County Palatine of Chester, is a title in the Baronetage of the United Kingdom. It was created on 8 July 1959 for Sir Harold Bibby, Chairman of the Bibby Line.

As of 2010 the title is held by Sir Harold's grandson, the third Baronet, who succeeded his father in 2002.

== Bibby baronets, of Tarporley (1959) ==
- Sir (Arthur) Harold Bibby, 1st Baronet, Kt., DSO (1889–1986)
- Sir Derek James Bibby, 2nd Baronet, MC (1922–2002)
- Sir Michael James Bibby, 3rd Baronet (born 1963)

The heir apparent is the present holder's son Alexander James Bibby (born 1997).

== Arms ==
Coat of arms of Bibby baronets

Crest
Upon a plate a cubit arm erect holding a sword in bend sinister Proper pomel and hilt or.
Escutcheon
Azure a saltire parted and fretty Argent surmounted in fess point by a lion rampant Pean between two escallops in pale and as many mullets of six points in fess of the second.
Motto
Vi Et Virtute
