= John S. Bibby =

British geologist

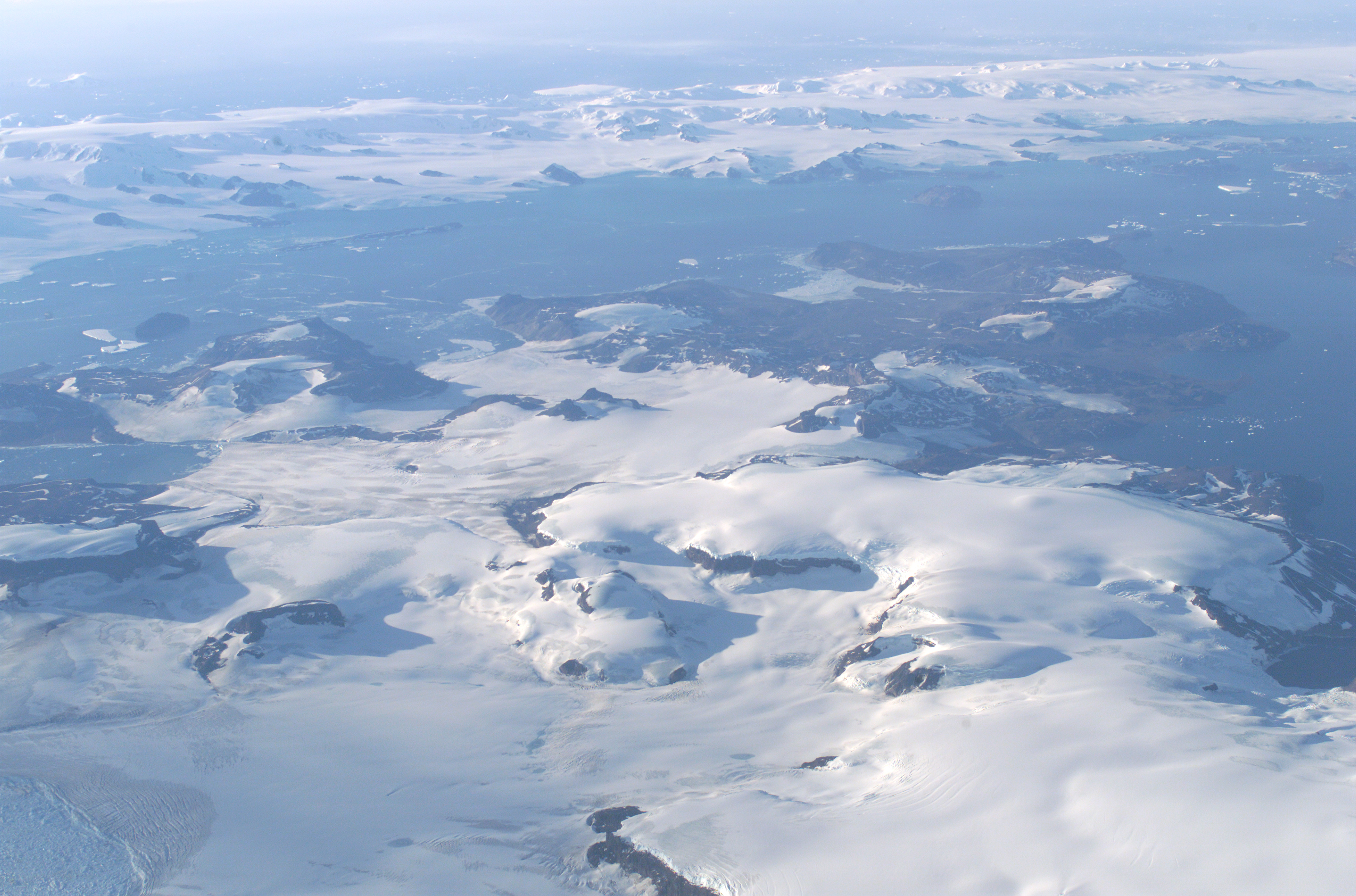
James Ross Island captured by NASA photographer James Ross

John S. Bibby B.S.c. (born 1935) is a British geologist. He was a member of the British Antarctic Survey which undertook four major geological surveys in the James Ross Island Group in 1958 and 1959. The first survey took 69 days in June–August 1958, and served as a reconnaissance of Bald Head, Botany Bay and the west coast of James Ross Island. The party of three hauled their own sledge but were supported and supplied by dog sledge. In September and October 1958 a further 52-day journey was undertaken, this time by dog sledge (which proved considerably more convenient). On this journey a plane table survey on a scale of 1:10,000 was carried out south-west of Brandy Bay, and on 1:20,000 over the Hidden Lake and Tumbledown Cliffs area.

During April 1959 a third journey was undertaken using a new overland route via Mondor Glacier and Mount Cardinall to View Point and then to Church Point area. The return journey was over the sea ice. The survey of the peninsula near Camp Hill was completed and a base map on a scale of 1:10,000 was made by plane-table methods.

The last survey, from July to November 1959, took 120 days. Mapping the north-west James Ross Island was completed, the Cretaceous outcrops in the south-east of James Ross Island and on Snow Hill Island were visited, and the previously unknown fossiliferous sediments at Cape Lamb provided valuable evidence in determining the relationships between ammonite faunas. Plane table maps were constructed of Bald Head (1:10,000) and an area between Lachman Crags and Bibby Point (1:20,000).

Bibby Point, a steep rocky point at the northeast corner of Brandy Bay, was named after John S. Bibby by the United Kingdom Antarctic Place-Names Committee (UK-APC).
