= List of storms named Sam =

The name Sam has been used for four tropical cyclones worldwide, one in the Atlantic Ocean, one in the Western Pacific Ocean, and one in the Australian region of the Indian Ocean.

In the North Atlantic:

- Hurricane Sam (2021) – a powerful long-lived Category 4 hurricane that churned in the open ocean.

In the Western Pacific:

- Tropical Storm Sam (1999) (T9910, 16W, Luding) – a Category 1-equivalent severe tropical storm that made landfall in the Philippines, China, and South Korea.

In the Australian region:

- Cyclone Sam (1977) – churned in the open ocean; renamed Cyclone Celimene when it crossed 90°E
- Cyclone Sam (2000) – a Category 5 severe tropical cyclone on the Australian scale that made landfall in Western Australia.

The name Sam was retired in the Australian region following the 2000–01 cyclone season.
