= Typhoon Orchid (1980) =

Pacific typhoon in 1980

Typhoon Orchid (Toyang)
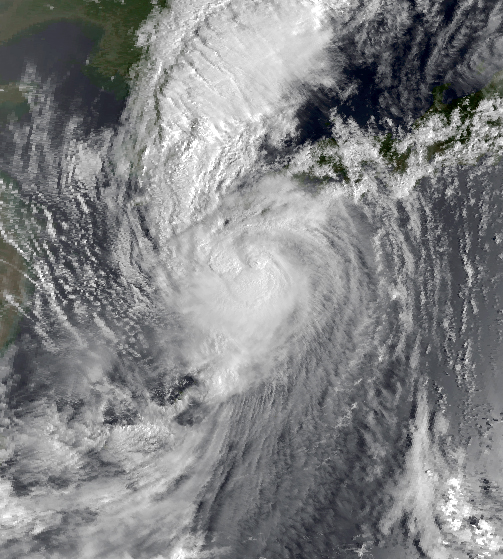
- Orchid in the late night of September 10, nearing Kyūshū as a typhoon.

Meteorological history
- Formed: September 1, 1980
- Dissipated: September 16, 1980

Typhoon
- 10-minute sustained (JMA)
- Highest winds: 130 km/h (80 mph)
- Lowest pressure: 960 hPa (mbar); 28.35 inHg

Category 2-equivalent typhoon
- 1-minute sustained (SSHWS/JTWC)
- Highest winds: 155 km/h (100 mph)
- Lowest pressure: 958 hPa (mbar); 28.29 inHg

Overall effects
- Fatalities: 53 total
- Damage: $27.6 million (1980 USD)
- Areas affected: Caroline Islands, Philippines, Japan
- IBTrACS
- Part of the 1980 Pacific typhoon season

Typhoon Orchid, known in the Philippines as Typhoon Toyang, was a deadly typhoon that formed during the 1980 Pacific typhoon season. The monsoon trough spawned a tropical depression on September 1. It tracked northwestward, remaining disorganized and dissipating on the 5th. Another tropical depression developed to the east of the old circulation, quickly becoming the primary circulation and intensifying to a tropical storm on the 6th. With generally weak steering currents, Orchid looped three times on its track, strengthening to a typhoon on the 9th and reaching a peak of 95 mph winds on the 10th. Early on the 11th the storm hit southwestern Japan, and became extratropical that day over the Japan Sea.

Orchid caused considerable damage from high winds and rain, resulting in at least nine casualties with 112 missing. It was also responsible for the loss of MV Derbyshire, believed to have sunk on 9 September with all 44 hands on board due to very rough seas. At 91,655 gross register tons, she is the largest British ship lost at sea.

== Meteorological history ==
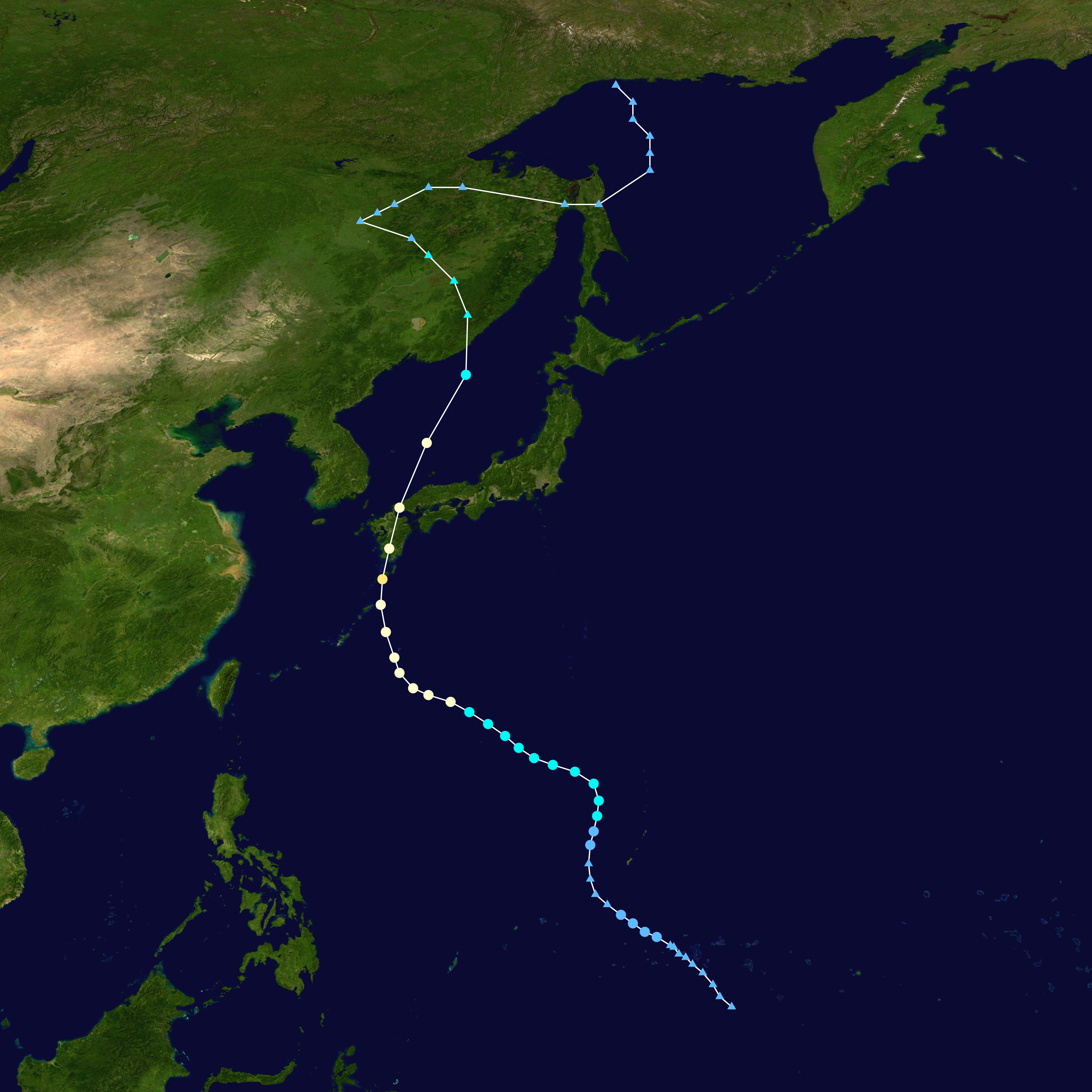
Map plotting the storm's track and intensity, according to the Saffir–Simpson scale Map key Saffir–Simpson scale Tropical depression (≤38 mph, ≤62 km/h) Tropical storm (39–73 mph, 63–118 km/h) Category 1 (74–95 mph, 119–153 km/h) Category 2 (96–110 mph, 154–177 km/h) Category 3 (111–129 mph, 178–208 km/h) Category 4 (130–156 mph, 209–251 km/h) Category 5 (≥157 mph, ≥252 km/h) Unknown Storm type Tropical cyclone Subtropical cyclone Extratropical cyclone, remnant low, tropical disturbance, or monsoon depression

An area of disturbance formed near east of Guam. The system had indicated signs of tropical cyclone formation and when reconnaissance aircraft investigated the system, they were unable to detect any signs of deep convection. According to sypnotic data, the system indicated that gale-force winds had existed. On September 1, the storm intensified into Tropical Depression 16W. On September 6, the now tropical depression had intensified into Tropical Storm Orchid.

The first tropical storm warning for Orchid was issued on September 7 at 02:00 UTC. Orchid soon entered the Philippine Area of Responsibility and had attained the name Toyang on September 8. Orchid had also attained typhoon status the same day. Orchid exited the Philippine Area of Responsibility on September 10.

On the 9th of September, Typhoon Orchid sank one of the largest British ships, the MV Derbyshire, which went down with 42 crew, as well as 2 crewman's wives, 230 miles (370 km) from Okinawa. Orchid soon made course towards the island of Kyushu. It headed north within a current and helped Orchid make landfall in Kyushu on September 10.

After making landfall, Orchid fully transformed into its extratropical stage on September 11. It continued north into Primorsky Krai and into Vladivostok, but caused no known damage. Orchid dissipated 5 days later, on September 16.

== Impact ==
=== Japan ===
Typhoon Orchid was the ninth tropical cyclone to strike Japan in the 1980 typhoon season. The storm killed six people in Kyushu and triggered devastating landslides on the country's main island of Honshu. The fruit and vegetable crops have sustained heavy damage from this. More than 15,000 people were affected due to the devastating landslides and wind gusts. 400 families had no homes during the time. Damages totaled to ¥6.236 billion (US$27.5 million).

=== MV Derbyshire ===
The loss of MV Derbyshire was devastating for Britain, since the 91,000 ton carrier was the largest of its time and had resulted in the deaths of all 44 people on board. The ship was headed for Kawasaki with Iron Ore Concentrate from Sept-Îles, Canada on July 11, but never arrived. Senior Assistant General Secretary Steve Hedley said to RMT:

“RMT pay tribute to the forty-two seafarers and two passengers who lost their lives when the MV Derbyshire was overwhelmed by Typhoon Orchid south of Japan on this day in 1980. Members of the National Union of Seaman, many from the Derbyshire’s home city of Liverpool were amongst those lost and this remains the largest UK flagged ship lost during peacetime."

=== Other ships ===
Ocean Container, which was being towed by tug ship Salvadore had its tug line separated due to tough waves just east of Shikoku, near Cape Shio. The Bea Urivage, which carried 240,000 tons of crude oil had been anchored because of rippling waves. Luckily, the ship received only minor damage. The Sea Hawk and the He Tian collided while anchored at Mutsure Island. The captain had died and the Sea Hawk sank, but everyone on both ships was rescued. The He Tian had apparently drifted due to Orchid's gusty winds. The Ryojin off of Ise Bay had dragged the anchor of the ship and rammed the Hyundai^{a}, but caused only minor damage.

== See also ==
- Other tropical cyclones named Orchid
- Other tropical cyclones named Toyang

== Notes ==
- ^a Not related to the Hyundai Motor Company.
