= John Bibby (businessman) =

British Slaver & businessman (1775–1840)

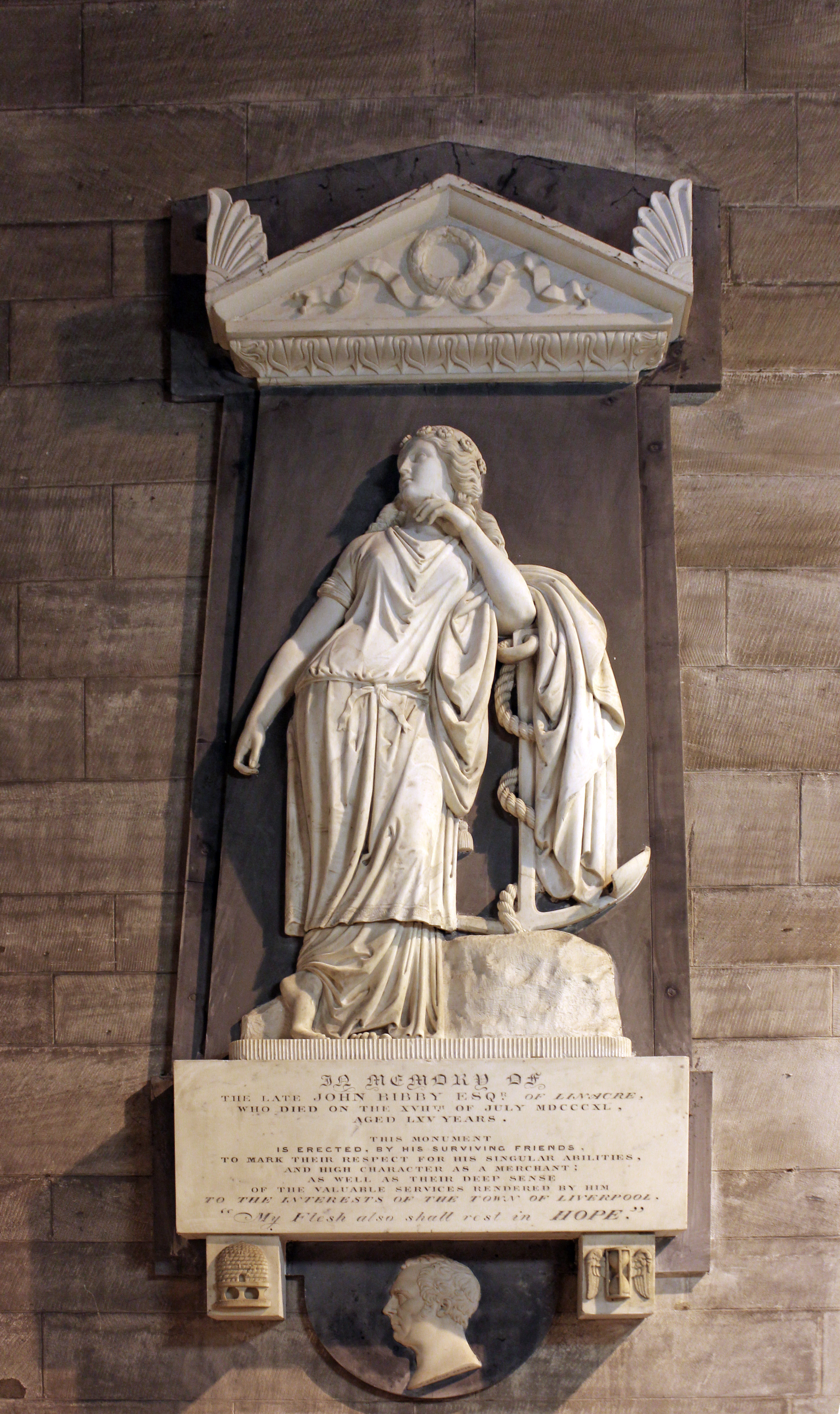
Memorial to Bibby in All Hallows church, Allerton

John Bibby (19 February 1775 – 17 July 1840) was the founder of the British Bibby Line shipping company in 1807, and co-owned three slave ships. He was born in Eccleston, near Ormskirk, Lancashire. He was murdered on 17 July 1840 on his way home from dinner at a friend's house in Kirkdale. The murder, believed to be a robbery gone wrong as his watch was stolen, was never solved.

== See also ==
- Bibby Stockholm
