= Tornadoes of 2009 =

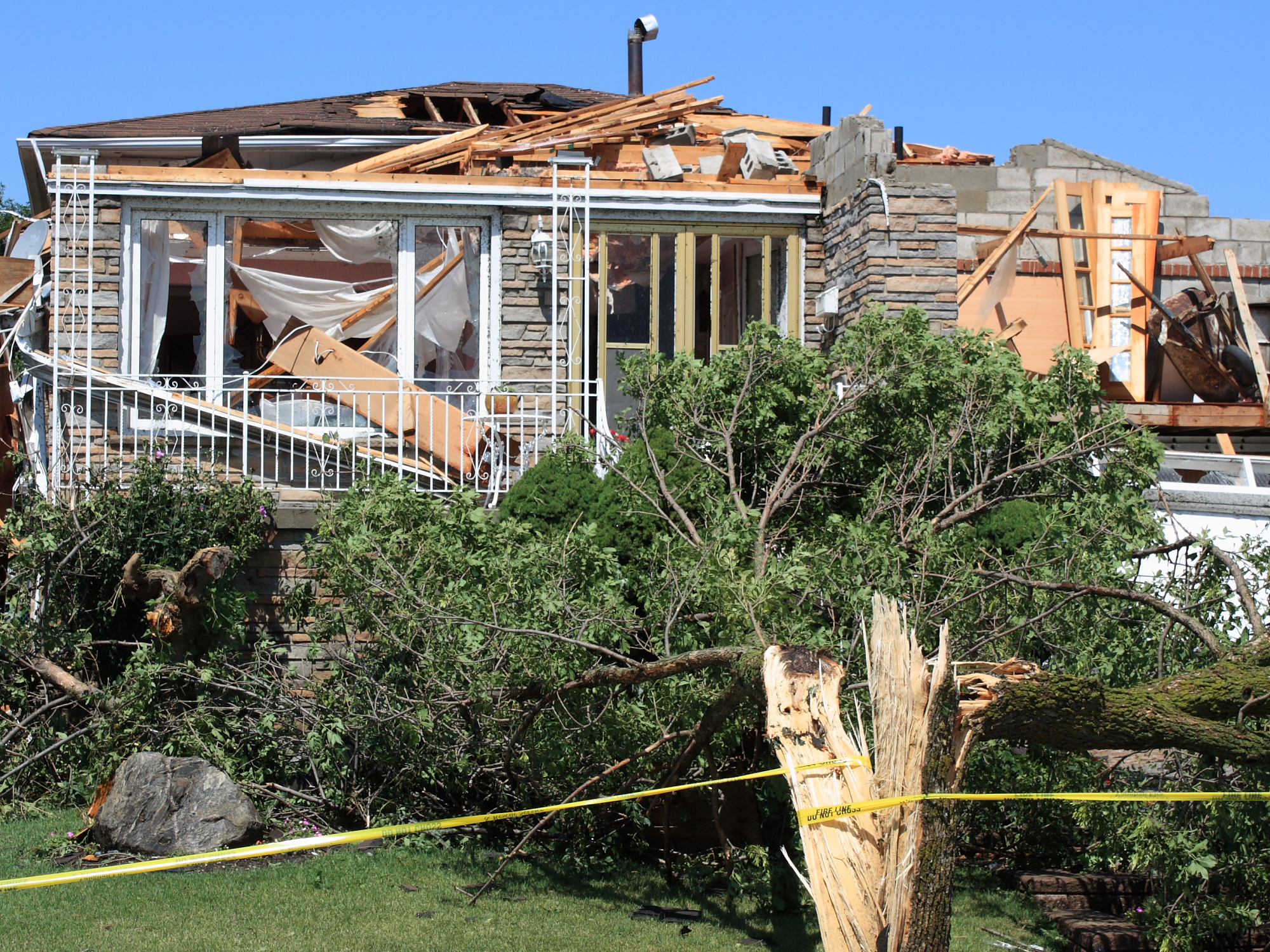
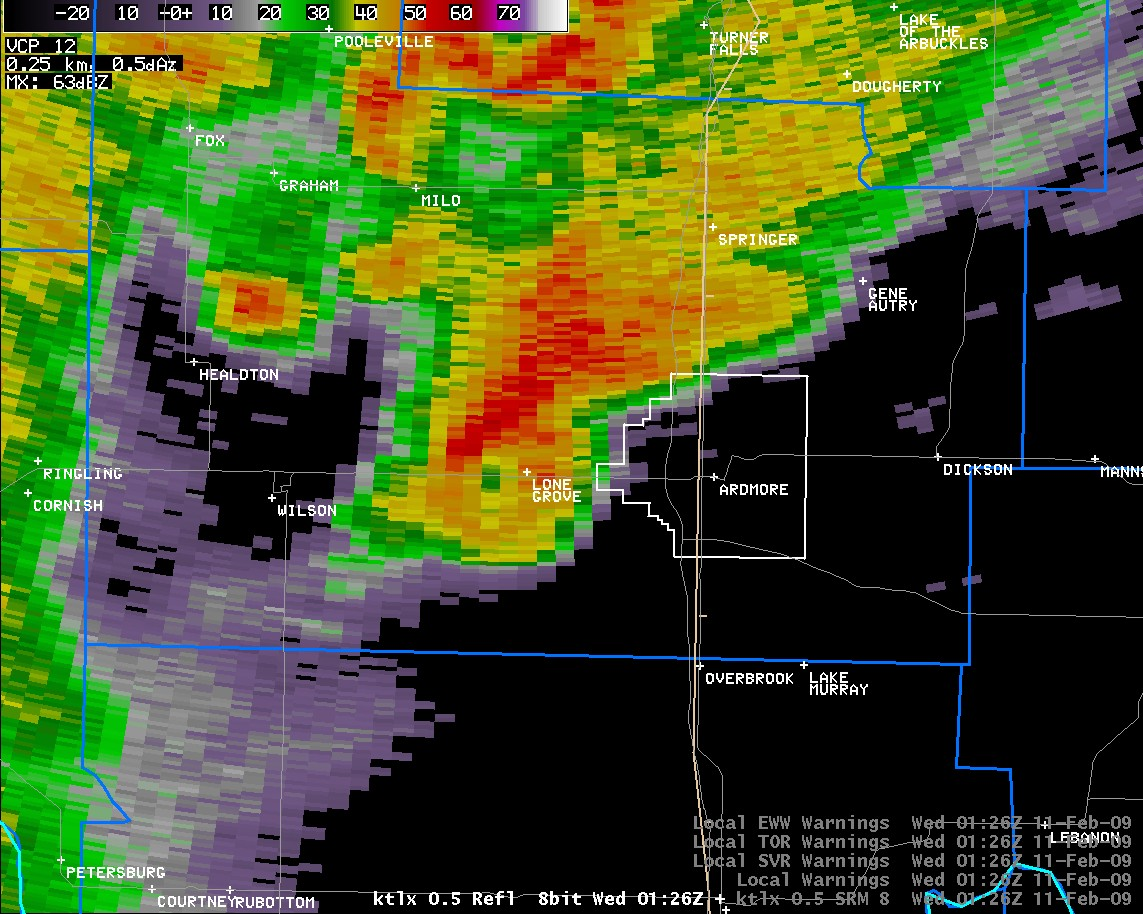
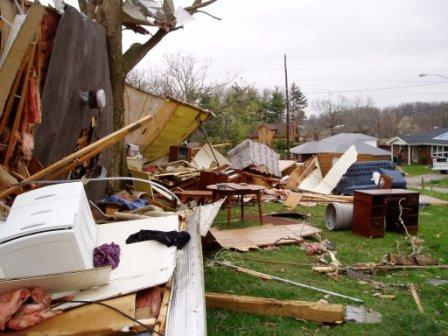
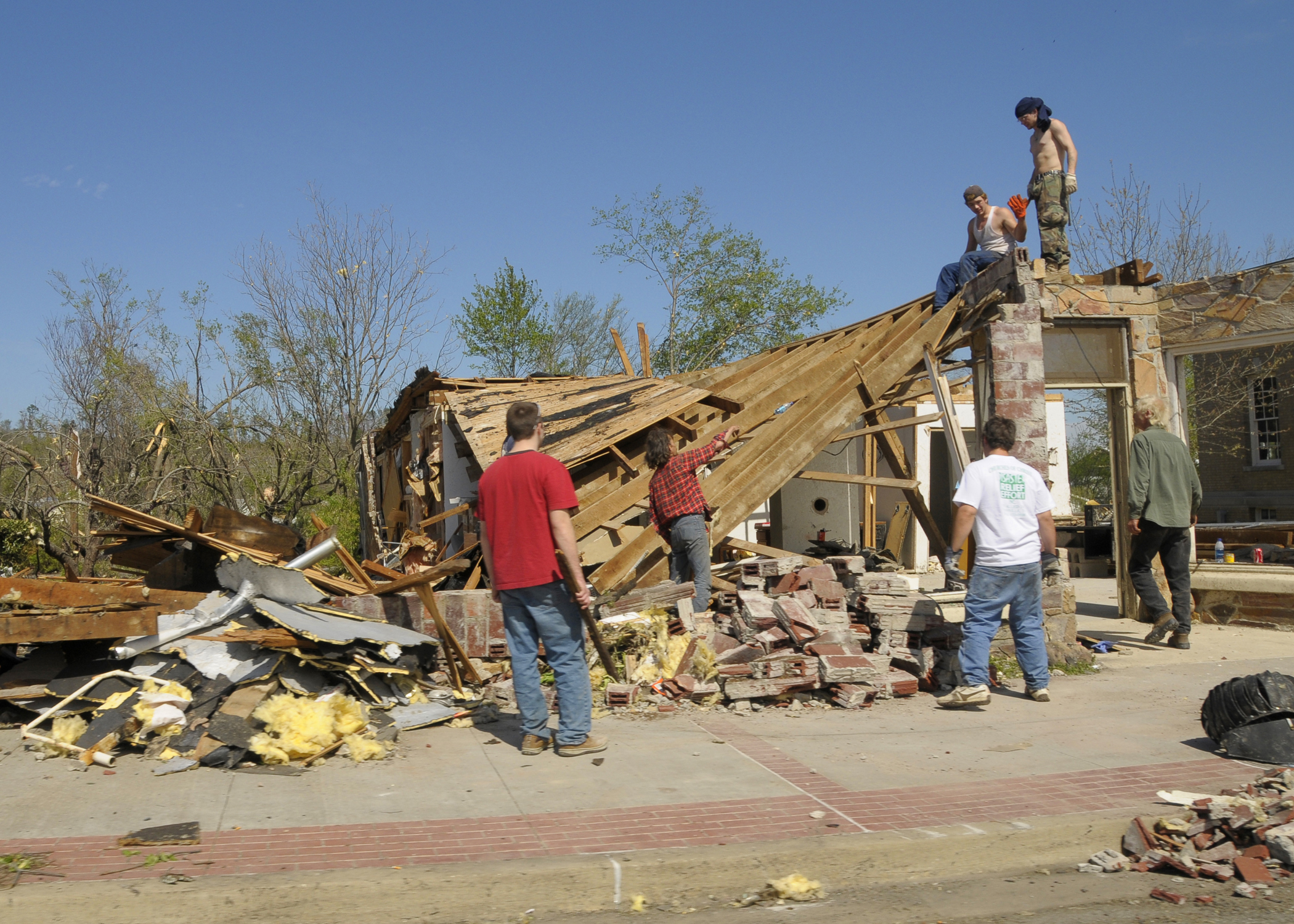
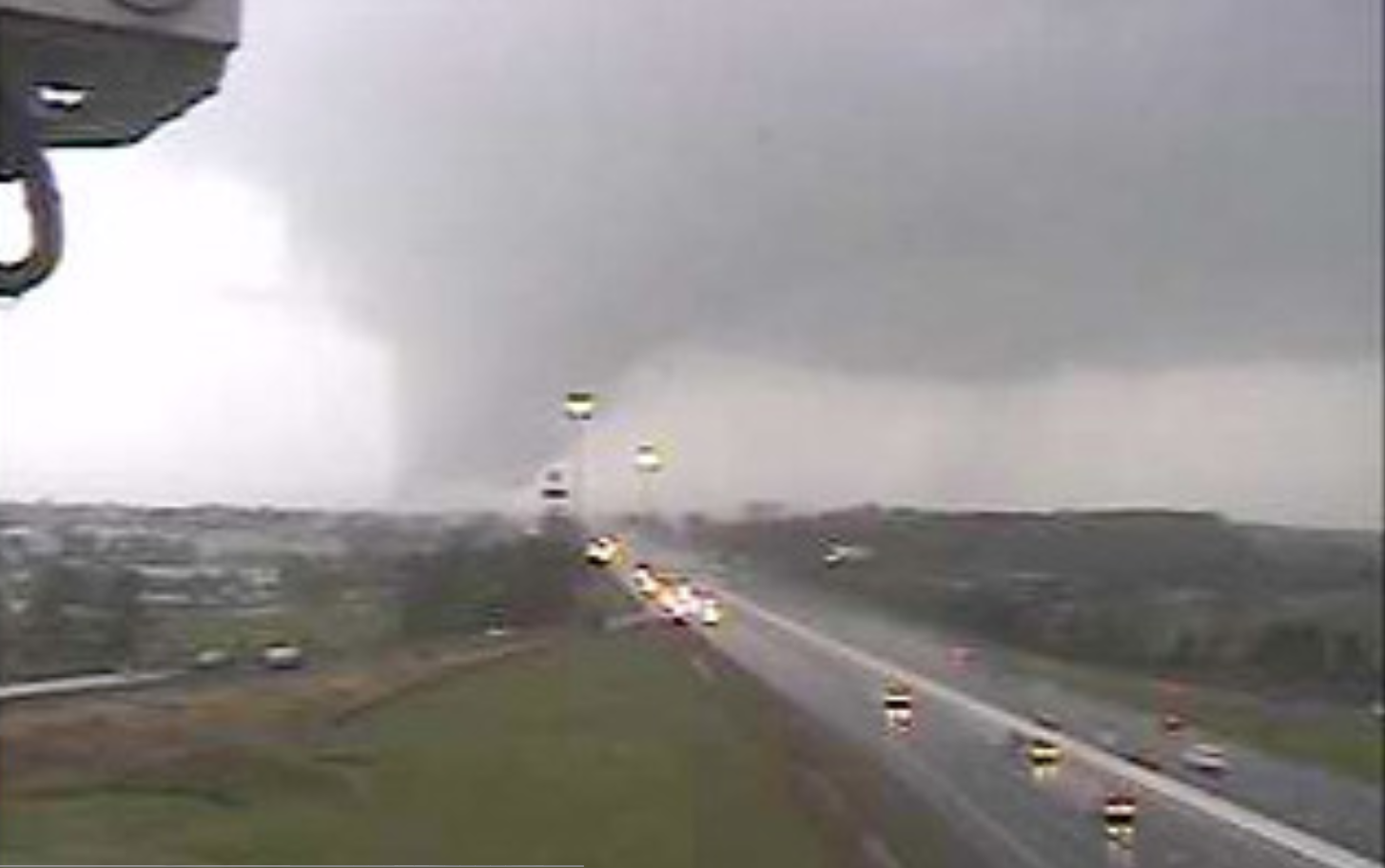
- Clockwise from top: A mobile radar truck observing an EF2 tornado in Goshen County, Wyoming on June 5; Radar imagery of an EF4 tornado hitting Lone Grove, Oklahoma on February 10; A collapsed home in Mena, Arkansas after an EF3 tornado on April 9; A large EF4 tornado seen approaching Murfreesboro, Tennessee on April 10; Damage in Corydon, Kentucky following an EF3 tornado on March 28; F2 damage to a home in Vaughan, Ontario following a tornado on August 20.
- Timespan: January 3 – December 24, 2009
- Maximum rated tornado: EF4 tornado: Lone Grove, Oklahoma on February 10; Murfreesboro, Tennessee on April 10; San Pedro, Misiones (F4) on September 7; Guaraciaba, Santa Catarina (F4) on September 7
- Tornadoes in U.S.: 1,147
- Damage (U.S.): $566 million
- Fatalities (U.S.): 22
- Fatalities (worldwide): 73

This page documents notable tornadoes and tornado outbreaks worldwide in 2009. Strong and destructive tornadoes form most frequently in the United States, Argentina, Brazil, Bangladesh, and Eastern India, but can occur almost anywhere under the right conditions. Tornadoes also develop occasionally in southern Canada during the Northern Hemisphere's summer and somewhat regularly at other times of the year across Europe, Asia, Argentina, Australia and New Zealand. Tornadic events are often accompanied by other forms of severe weather, including strong thunderstorms, strong winds, and hail. In the U.S., there were 1,304 reports of tornadoes received by the Storm Prediction Center, and 1,147 tornadoes were confirmed to have taken place. Worldwide, 73 fatalities were caused by tornadoes; 22 in the United States, 20 in India, 11 in Argentina, eight in the Philippines, four each in Canada and Brazil, two in Greece and one each in Serbia and Russia.

Tornadic activity in 2009 began with the development an EF1 tornado near Stringer, Mississippi on January 3 and ended with the dissipation of an EF0 tornado near Vancleave, Mississippi on December 24. During the year the two strongest tornadoes were both assessed as an EF4 – one occurred in Oklahoma on February 10 and the second occurred in Tennessee on April 10. During the early months of the year tornadic activity remained mostly below average in contrast to an active trend of tornadoes in 2008. Activity peaked in April and May as a result of destabilizing atmospheric conditions and featured a bulk of the year's tornadoes. However, the number of developing tornadoes subsequently began to wane and remained generally inactive for the latter half of 2009.

== Synopsis ==
In contrast to the first nine months of 2008, the final quarter was fairly inactive overall, and the inactivity continued into January 2009 with only a few tornadoes in the US the entire month as generally stable air dominated. The pattern broke for the first time on February 10 when a modest tornado outbreak occurred, but produced a deadly tornado in Oklahoma. The severe weather activity changed to a moderate pace for the remainder of February into March, and although the start of the season did not have a large prolific tornado outbreak, it has had several notable events. Overall activity in March ran near normal.

The start of Easter weekend brought the first large outbreak of 2009, with many tornadoes on both April 9 and 10. Steady activity through the remainder of April sent the month above average. May started quite active, but in a rather unusual pattern as most tornadoes in the early part of the month were due to summer-like derechos as opposed to large-scale supercells. The second half of May was unusually quiet, with few significant severe weather events. June saw activity return to an above normal pace, and the middle part of the month was particularly active. However, most of the tornadoes were in open country, and activity was steady over many days as opposed to a large outbreak.

The second half of 2009, overall, was not active. July also ran near normal, but August ran below normal with most of the activity concentrated in a single non-tropical outbreak. Without any landfalling tropical cyclones in the Atlantic and a relatively stable air mass, September was extremely quiet with only a very small number of isolated weak tornadoes. While October was near average tornado-wise, activity stabilized greatly again in November and it produced only three tornadoes, one of the least active months in recent years. December was more active, primarily as a result of a moderate outbreak just before Christmas.

== Events ==
=== United States yearly total ===
Confirmed tornadoes by Enhanced Fujita rating
EFU	EF0	EF1	EF2	EF3	EF4	EF5	Total
0	695	348	82	20	2	0	1,147

Fatal United States tornadoes in 2009
- Approximate touchdown location of killer tornadoes in 2009 Summary of tornadoes: February 10 – Oklahoma (8 deaths); February 18 – Georgia (1 death); April 9 – Arkansas (3 deaths); April 10 – Tennessee (2 deaths); April 19 – Alabama (1 death); May 8 – Missouri (1 death); May 8 – Kentucky (2 deaths); May 13 – Missouri (1 death); May 13 – Missouri (2 deaths); October 9 – Mississippi (1 death); Total fatalities: 22

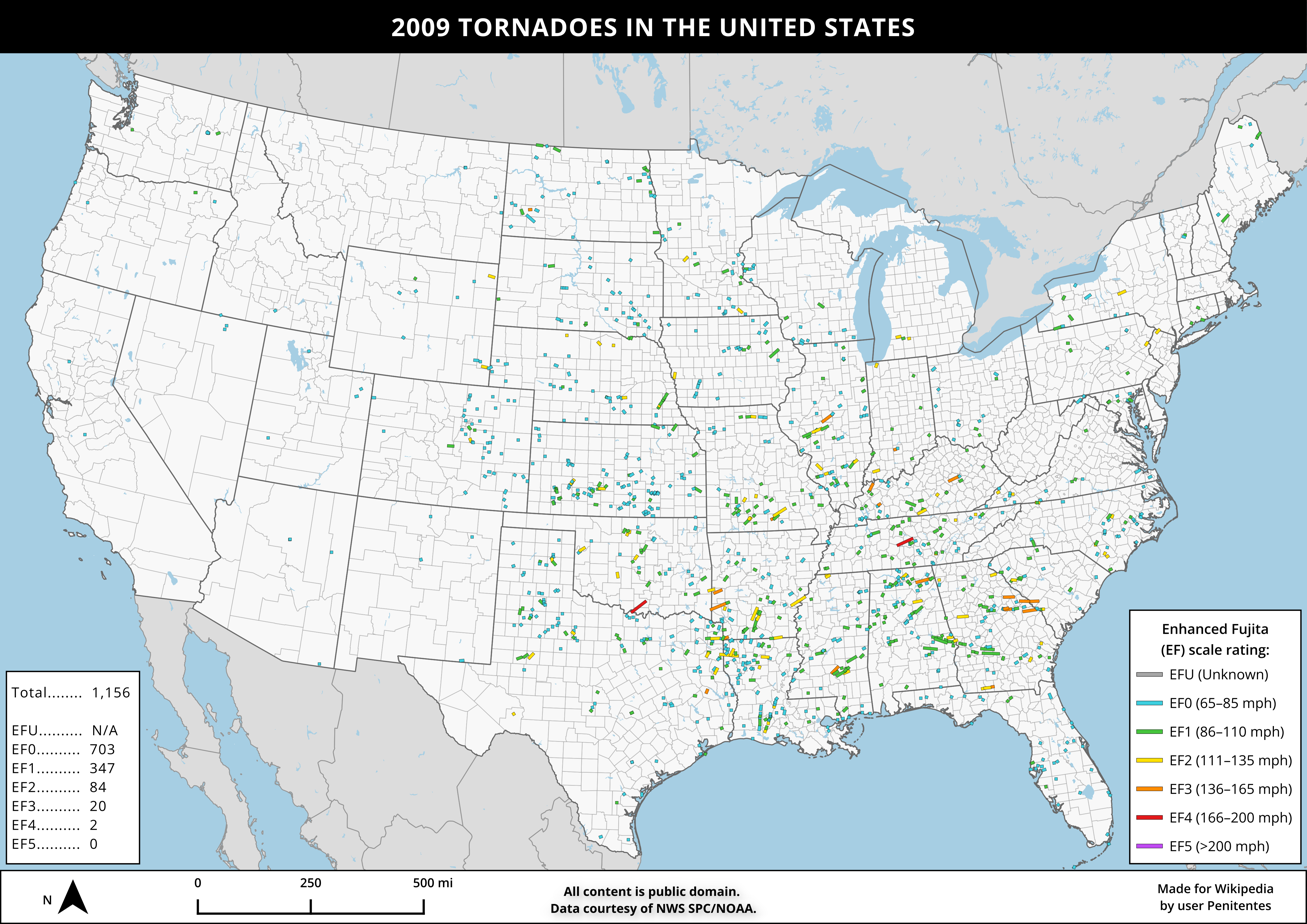
A map of 2009 United States tornado paths from the results of storm surveys.
- Interactive map

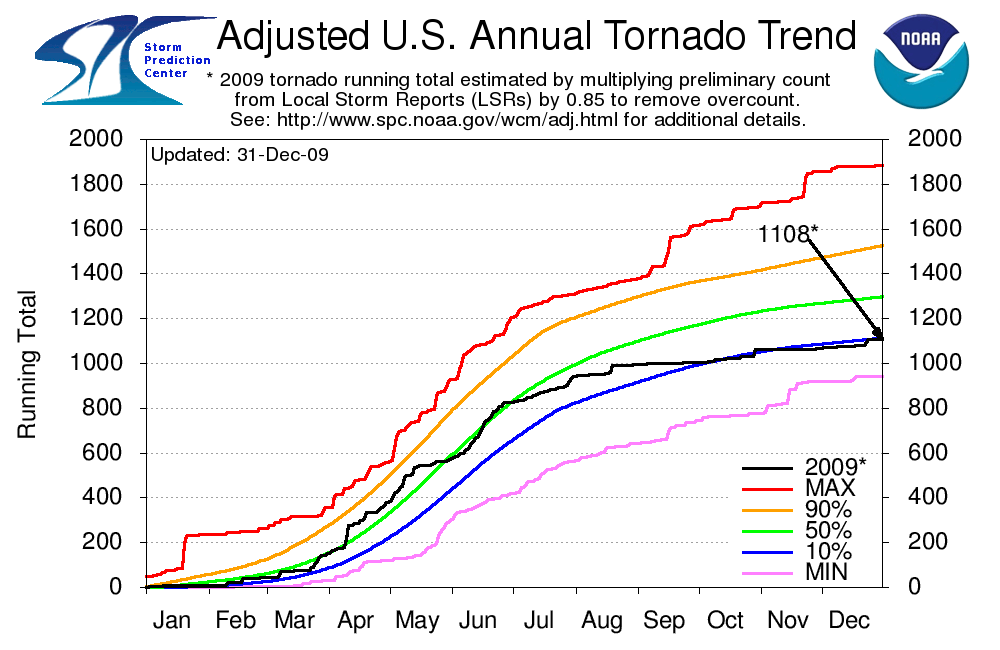
Adjusted annual tornado report count in the United States compared to minimum, maximum, and climatological percentiles

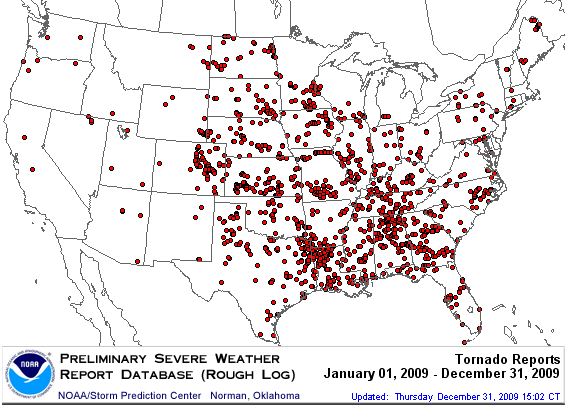
Map of all local storm reports received by the Storm Prediction Center in the United States in 2009

== January ==
There were 10 tornadoes reported in the United States in January, of which 6 were confirmed. Activity throughout the month was far below-average, with all tornadoes forming within localized events. The most notable tornado was an EF1 that struck McIntosh, Alabama on January 10, causing $2.5 million in damage. No casualties took place throughout the month and total losses from the storms reached $2.7 million.

Across Europe, there were six tornadoes reporting during the month, one of which in Italy was rated F1 on January 27.

== February ==
There were 44 tornadoes reported in the US in February, of which 36 were confirmed.

Across Europe, nine tornadoes were reported during the month. The most intense of these was an F2 (T4) tornado that struck Málaga, Spain on February 1. On February 14, four people were killed in Nizip, Turkey. Overall, tornadoes were responsible for 4 fatalities and 31 injuries in Europe during February.

=== February 1 (Spain) ===
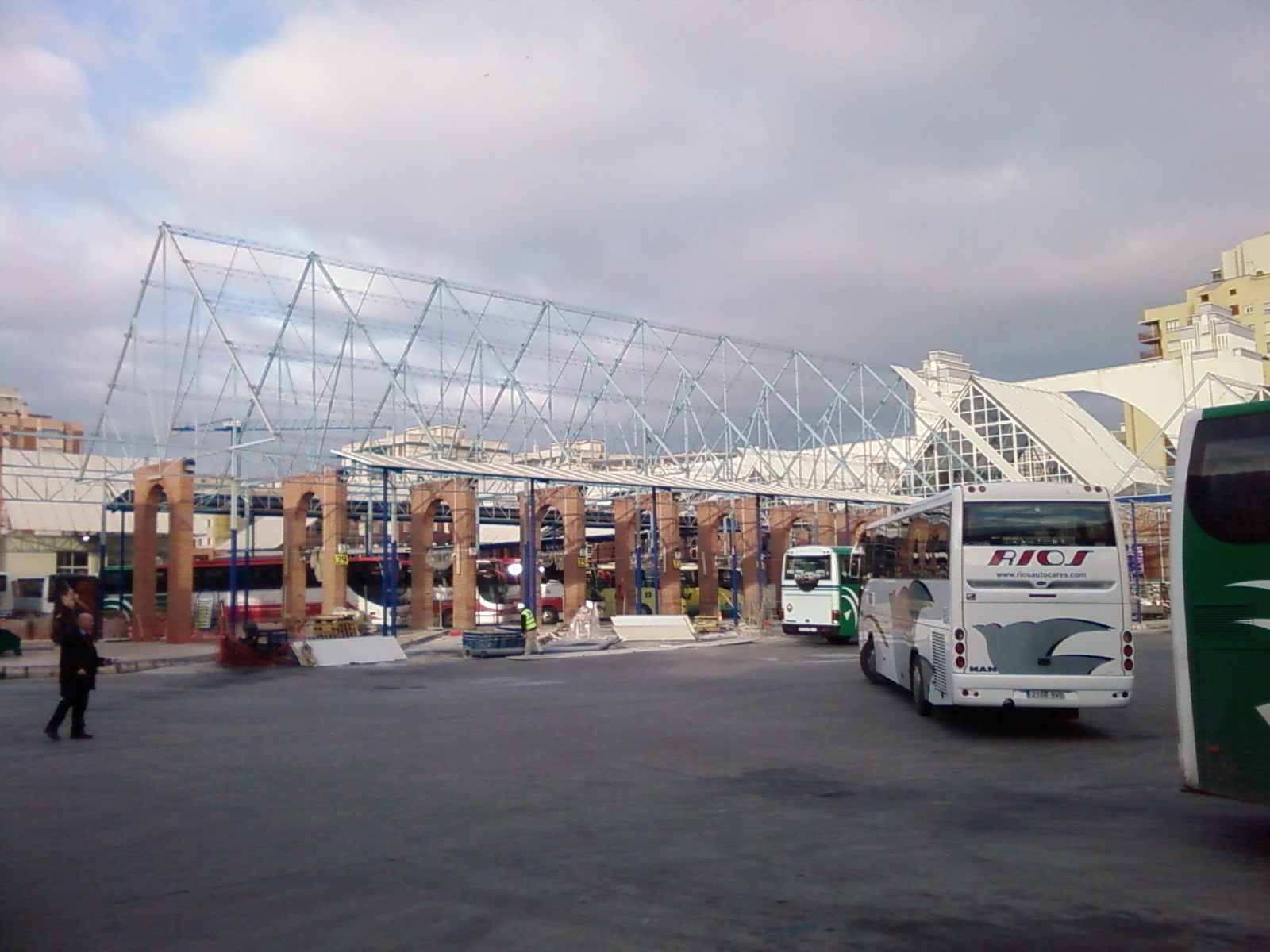
Damage to the roof of a bus station in Málaga, Spain after an F2 (T4) tornado on February 1.

25 people were injured when a tornado hit the city of Málaga in Spain, causing extensive damage to property, windows and vehicles. Most of those injured had been cut by glass, although branches and advertising boards blown around by winds up to 180 kilometres per hour (110 mph) resulted in some of the injuries. More than 200 houses were affected, along with 400 cars and 100 industrial warehouses. Nearly 1000 children were without classes because of the damage done to six schools in the city. The tornado was rated as an F2 (T4) by the European Severe Weather Database.

=== February 10–11 (Continental United States) ===
EFU	EF0	EF1	EF2	EF3	EF4	EF5
0	3	9	1	0	1	0

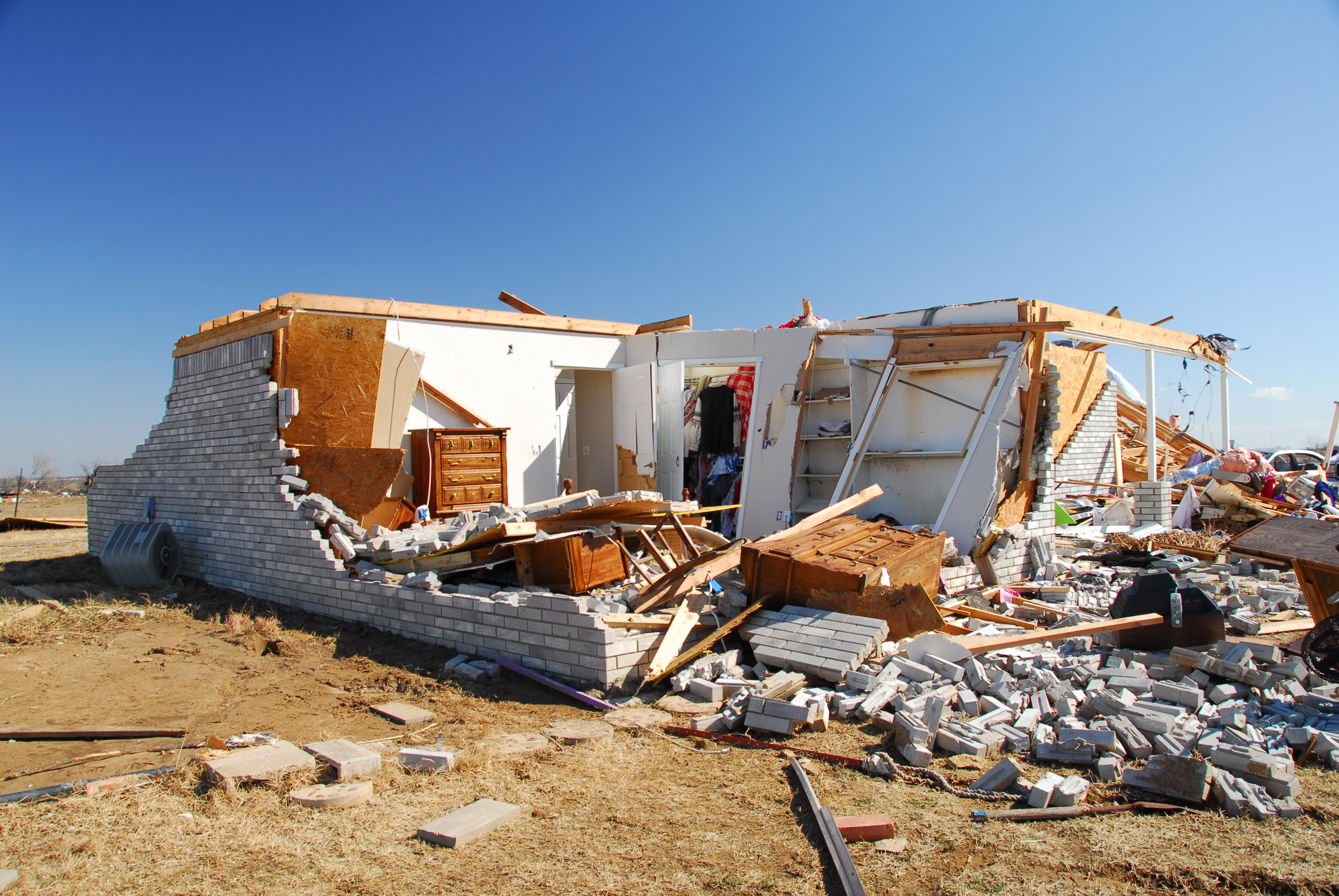
Damage in Lone Grove, Oklahoma caused by an EF4 tornado on February 10.

For February 10, the Storm Prediction Center issued a moderate risk for severe weather for portions of eastern Oklahoma, northeastern Texas, western Arkansas, and northwest Louisiana. It was projected that supercell thunderstorms would form late in the afternoon with a squall line developing during the evening.

During the afternoon, an EF1 tornado touched down northwest of Warr Acres, near the Northwest Expressway, resulting in damage to several businesses in the area. Afterwards, an EF2 tornado struck Edmond, where six homes were destroyed, eight structures received major damage, 51 received minor damage and another 166 structures were affected. Later in the evening, an EF4 tornado devastated the city of Lone Grove, killing eight people, injuring 46 others and destroying 114 homes and mobile homes. The Lone Grove tornado was the deadliest to hit Oklahoma since May 3, 1999 (until May 20, 2013), and the strongest tornado during the month of February in Oklahoma since 1950. The previous strongest were two F3 tornadoes which touched down on February 17, 1961.

The Storm Prediction Center also issued a very large slight risk area for February 11 which encompassed parts of the Deep South, Ohio Valley, Midwest, and Appalachians. However, the risk for tornadoes was lower on February 11 due to stronger frontal forcing (which limited discrete supercell activity) and lower instability. The risk area was upgraded to a moderate risk later in the day, but mainly for damaging downburst winds and isolated tornadoes.

=== February 16 (Country of Georgia) ===
A tornado, which local authorities believe is the first ever in the nation's history, touched down in the country of Georgia. No injuries were reported, but the tornado damaged trees and around 100 homes in the Tsalendzikhsky and Zugdidsky districts.

=== February 18 ===
FU	EF0	EF1	EF2	EF3	EF4	EF5
0	2	6	2	3	0	0

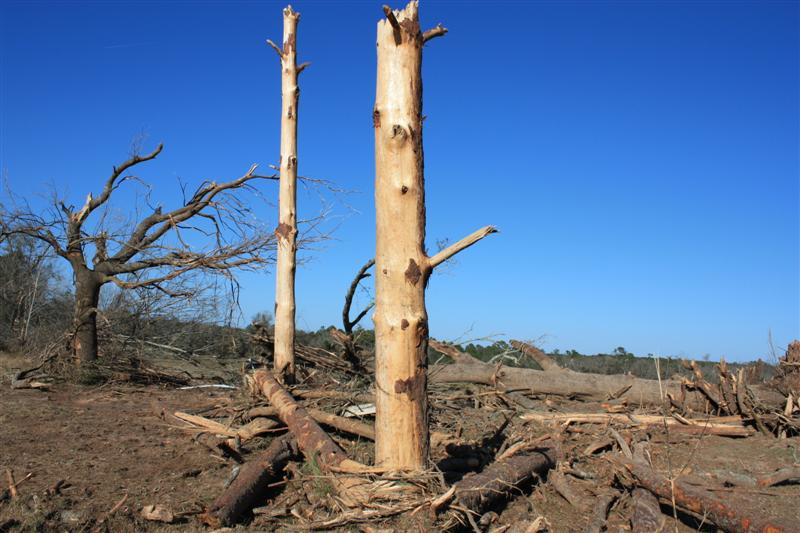
Large pine trees stripped of their bark and snapped in half near Boston, Georgia

Strong southwesterly winds transported a moist air mass northeastward across the Gulf Coast states and the Tennessee Valley. The moisture combined with daytime heating to support a moderately unstable air mass in advance of a cold front, which pushed southeastward across the Tennessee Valley and Gulf States during the afternoon and evening. The cold front combined with a strong jet stream aloft resulted in the development of severe thunderstorms along the cold front. As a result, a moderate risk of severe weather was issued by the Storm Prediction Center for portions of Louisiana, Mississippi, Alabama, Georgia and the Florida Panhandle. Several tornadoes touched down during the afternoon and evening hours of February 18. The strongest tornado was rated as an EF3 tornado, which traveled 18.6 miles (29.9 km) through Wilkes and McDuffie counties in Georgia. It destroyed a cinder block home, damaged 15 homes and destroyed 19 outbuildings. One person was killed in Hancock County after an EF3 tornado destroyed a church and four mobile homes in the area. A mile-wide EF2 tornado that touched down in Meriwether County damaged several homes with one home completely losing its roof. One person was injured by debris as an EF1 tornado traveled through Putnam County, destroying a restaurant on the southwest side of Eatonton. US 129 was shut down after high winds downed power lines. Two different tornadoes caused damage in Jasper County, each with winds of 100 miles per hour (160 km/h). In Newton County, 20 to 30 homes in a heavily wooded subdivision were damaged by trees blown down by an EF1 tornado that was on the ground for 2 miles (3.2 km). Other tornadoes, with winds ranging from 70 miles per hour (110 km/h) to 90 miles per hour (140 km/h), occurred in Taylor, Houston and Oconee counties. In the southern portion of Georgia, a supercell thunderstorm produced two tornadoes (rated EF2 and EF3) in Grady and Thomas counties. In Thomas County alone, there were 160 structures damaged with nine mobile homes destroyed and 20 single family homes destroyed. In Alabama, an EF1 tornado tracked across a forest in Randolph County, where several hundred trees were either snapped off or blown down.

=== February 28 ===
EFU	EF0	EF1	EF2	EF3	EF4	EF5
0	1	1	1	0	0	0

A cold front pushed into warm, moist air in Alabama, Georgia and the Florida Panhandle on February 28, resulting in severe thunderstorms in southern and central Alabama into central Georgia during the morning. At 7:40 a.m CST (1340 UTC) rain fell from the sky and an EF0 tornado blew down several trees and power lines and destroyed two outbuildings in southern Tallapoosa County. 31 minutes later, an EF1 tornado heavily damaged a building and overturned a car at a car dealership in Lee County. At 8:26 am CST (1426 UTC), 10 mobile homes, seven homes, two churches and a school were damaged after an EF2 tornado touched down in Salem, which is also in Lee County.

== March ==
There were 123 tornadoes reported in the US in March, of which 115 were confirmed.

Across Europe, 14 tornadoes were reported throughout March.

=== March 8 ===
EFU	EF0	EF1	EF2	EF3	EF4	EF5
0	5	10	3	1	0	0

A moderate risk of severe weather was issued for eastern Missouri, Illinois and Indiana on March 8. but was later downgraded to a slight risk for a large portion of the Ohio Valley. The most powerful tornado of the outbreak was an EF3 that struck Fayetteville in Lawrence County, Indiana, where 19 homes were damaged with three of them destroyed. As a line of supercell thunderstorms quickly moved through southwestern Illinois, ten tornadoes were spawned in the region. Near Springfield, Illinois, a tornado, rated EF1 on the Enhanced Fujita Scale, destroyed seven homes and damaged thirty others in Loami.

=== March 12 (Philippines) ===
A large tornado touched down in South Cotabato Province in the township of Tupi around 3:00 pm PHT (0700 UTC). The tornado destroyed 18 hectares of farmland, causing eight million pesos (166,000 USD) in damage during its 15-minute existence. No structures were reported to have been damaged and no one was injured.

=== March 23–29 ===
EFU	EF0	EF1	EF2	EF3	EF4	EF5
0	22	27	5	2	0	0

An upper trough moved from the Four Corners region into the southern Great Plains and lower Missouri Valley during the day on March 23. During this, a surface low in western portions of Nebraska pushed into eastern South Dakota. A cold front combined with the low moved across the central and southern Great Plains and was the main area where thunderstorm development would occur. Although moisture was limited, strong wind shear created favorable conditions for supercells to develop and rotate. As a result, the supercells had the potential to produce tornadoes. A moderate risk of severe weather was issued for portions of central and eastern Kansas and northern Oklahoma. During the day, a fast-moving supercell produced several tornadoes in eastern Nebraska and across the state line into the west central portion of Iowa. Five tornadoes occurred in eastern Nebraska, with eight people injured in Eagle. In Iowa, an EF2 tornado destroyed one home, damaged another home, a barn and seven outbuildings and derailed 54 empty grain rail cars in Harrison County. The supercell then moved into Montgomery County, where it produced two EF0 tornadoes.

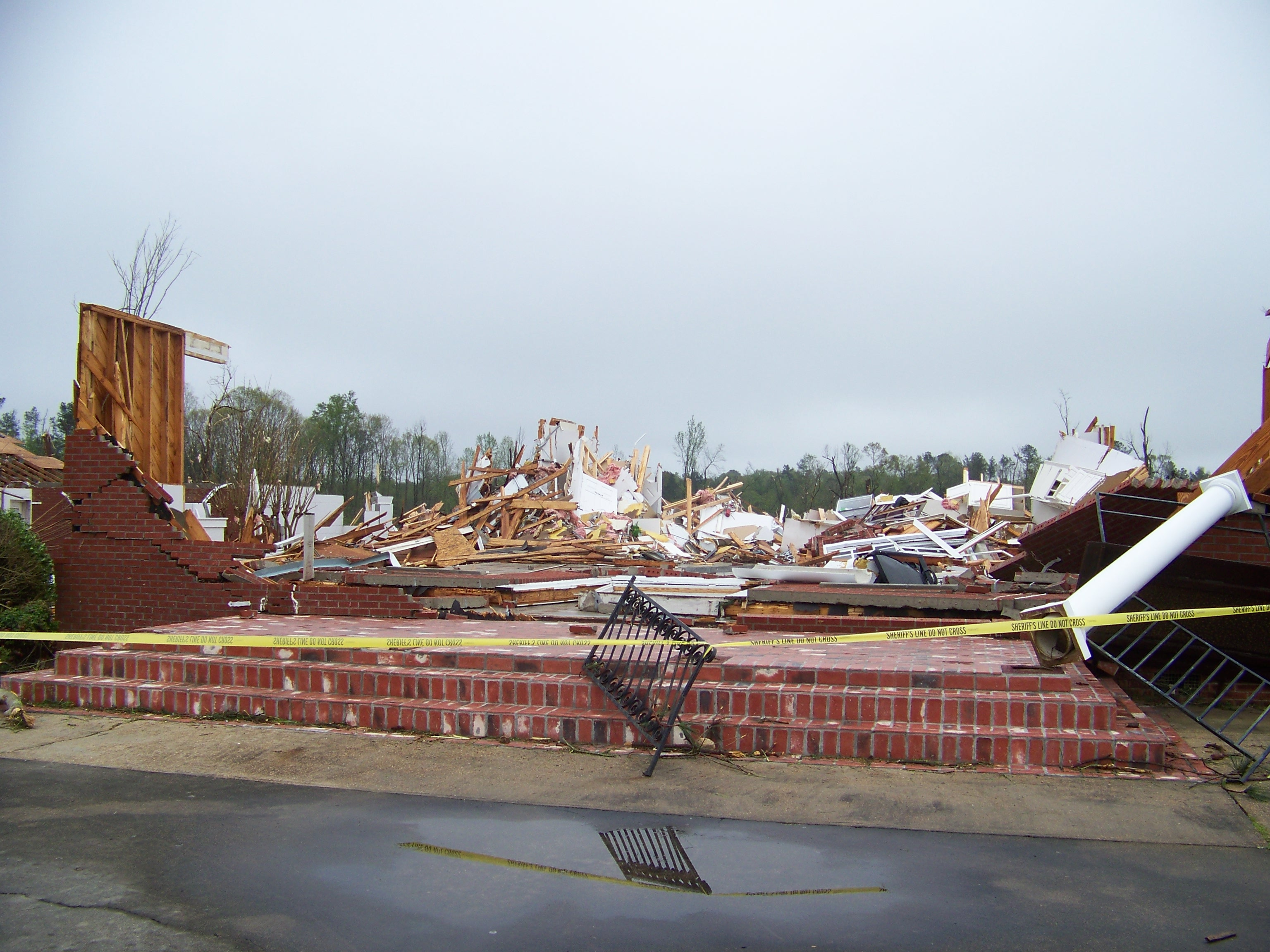
Damage from the EF3 Magee, Mississippi tornado

Isolated tornadic activity continued through March 24 and again the next day beginning with an EF1 tornado near Meridian, Mississippi on March 25. During the early morning hours of March 26, severe thunderstorms produced six tornadoes in central sections of Mississippi. The most powerful tornado spawned was an EF3 that struck Magee. Sixty homes were either damaged or destroyed with 25 people injured from the tornado. A church was destroyed and a warehouse was severely damaged. An EF2 tornado, three EF1, and an EF0 also occurred as the severe weather moved through the area. A state of emergency was declared for 12 counties by the Governor of Mississippi Haley Barbour. The thunderstorms also produced three tornadoes, one rated EF1 and the other two rated EF0, in southeastern Louisiana and coastal regions of Mississippi. The EF1 tornado damaged seven homes, extensively damaged one trailer and injured one person in Tangipahoa Parish.

Another round of severe weather developed late that evening, producing another intense squall line with embedded tornadoes across the northern Gulf Coast region early on March 27, where several tornadoes were reported. Later during the afternoon, various tornadoes developed in North Carolina, causing structural damage in eastern North Carolina. The tornadoes formed after a disturbance moved into the area from Alabama. One of the tornadoes near Parkton was rated as an EF2 and injured one person.

More tornadoes occurred on March 28, as they affected Tennessee and Kentucky during the afternoon. A supercell that tracked through three different counties in western areas of Kentucky produced two tornadoes. One of them was an EF3 tornado that destroyed six homes, caused major damage to 10 homes and minor damage to 60 homes and businesses in Corydon. In Tennessee, an EF1 tornado caused damage to several businesses in Murfreesboro, including the local Boys and Girls Club and a shopping plaza, which was heavily damaged. Another EF1 tornado destroyed a modular home and damaged three other homes in Ashland City.

Severe thunderstorms caused widespread damage throughout Pennsylvania on March 29. An EF1 tornado was produced in Lancaster County, damaging 238 structures across a path of 10 miles (16 km) from Lititz to Denver, most of which were 200 homes that were damaged by hail. Thirty barns suffered moderate damage, one barn sustained major damage, six trailer homes were destroyed with two others suffering major damage. Three people were injured by the tornado, which altogether cost an estimated $3 million in damage.

=== March 25 (Greece) ===
A rare tornado touched down in Nea Manolada in southwestern Greece on March 25. The most severe damage was to a vehicle where two of the occupants (all from Bulgaria) were killed and a third was critically injured. Extensive damage was also reported to numerous houses and businesses in the area. The European Severe Weather Database later confirmed this tornado to be an F2 tornado, with a path length of 10 miles (16 km).

=== March 31 (India) ===
A tornado struck the east coast of Indian state Orissa in the Kendrapara's Rajkanika block, killing 20 people and injuring at least 200 others. Four villages were completely destroyed by the tornado, cars were thrown significant distances, and concrete roofs were torn off buildings. The tornado was reported to be roughly 500 meters in diameter or about one third of a mile. Six people were killed after the motor boat they were on was picked up by the tornado and thrown across the Baitarani River. Survivors of the storm said that the destruction matched that of the 1999 Orissa cyclone. Trees throughout the area were defoliated and debris littered the ground and hung from trees. The day following the tornado, high temperatures were present, but residents struggled to find shelter from the heat. The tornado touched down during the late afternoon hours just before 5:00 pm IST (1130 UTC). At least 300 homes were destroyed by the tornado which was followed by a hail storm. A total of 11 villages were affected. along the tornado's one-hour track through Orissa. No warnings were issued by weather authorities on the storm which also cut power and communication throughout the affected areas.

== April ==
There were 270 tornadoes reported in the US in April, of which 226 were confirmed.

Across Europe, ten tornadoes were reported during April, none of which caused notable damage.

=== April 2 ===
EFU	EF0	EF1	EF2	EF3	EF4	EF5
0	10	5	0	0	0	0

A moderate risk of severe weather was issued for a large area of the southern United States from the Mississippi Delta to northeast Florida. Activity began almost immediately in the Gulf Coast region as thunderstorms developed right at dawn and moved inland. Early in the afternoon, two EF0 tornadoes were produced in southern Mississippi, one of which caused minor damage to 14 homes in a subdivision in Ocean Springs. The severe weather also affected Alabama, where three EF0 and EF1 tornadoes occurred during the afternoon and evening hours. At around 4:00 pm CDT (2100 UTC), an EF1 tornado struck near the Nashville International Airport in Nashville, Tennessee. It caused minor damage to homes and downed several trees before crossing a pike, where it then caused damage to several businesses. The tornado continued moving northward, damaging more homes before lifting.

=== April 9–11 ===
EFU	EF0	EF1	EF2	EF3	EF4	EF5
0	29	39	12	9	1	0

A storm system over the southern Great Plains region resulted in severe weather development during the late afternoon and evening along a dry line that stretched from southern Kansas across northeastern Oklahoma into southwestern Missouri and northwest Arkansas. As a result, a moderate risk of severe weather was issued by the Storm Prediction Center for eastern Oklahoma, southeast Kansas, southwest Missouri and western Arkansas. The system approached as the atmosphere destabilized as a result of daytime heating. Thunderstorms began developing along a dry line in Oklahoma during the early afternoon hours. More thunderstorms started forming as they approached into western Arkansas, and encountered a strong wind field around the incoming system. Winds began turning with height, which caused some thunderstorms to rotate and spawn tornadoes. Beginning at 6:20 CDT (2320 UTC), several tornadoes were produced in eastern sections of Oklahoma and Texas. The severe weather then moved into Arkansas, where an EF3 tornado killed three people in Mena. The thunderstorms that affected Texas then went into Louisiana, creating numerous tornadoes in the state, one of which tracked through downtown Shreveport.

On April 10 (Good Friday), the storm system moved east into the Tennessee Valley and eventually into the Carolinas during the night. The Storm Prediction Center issued a moderate risk of severe weather for sections of the Tennessee Valley, Gulf Coast states and into the southern Appalachians region. As the system moved across the lower Ohio Valley area, a line of thunderstorms started to produce tornadoes in parts of Kentucky and Tennessee. One of the tornadoes that struck Tennessee was an EF4 that killed two people in Murfreesboro. Portions of the moderate risk area in northeastern Alabama, northwestern Georgia and southeastern Tennessee were upgraded to a high risk at 1:44 pm CDT (1844 UTC). The thunderstorms moved southeast across much of South Carolina, Georgia and Alabama. They produced tornadoes in northeastern and central sections of Alabama. One area of thunderstorms produced a long-tracked tornado that moved from Grovetown, Georgia, through Augusta and ended in Ellenton, South Carolina. The tornado moved across Augusta but missed the Augusta National Golf Club where the Masters Tournament was taking place during the weekend.

=== April 19 ===
EFU	EF0	EF1	EF2	EF3	EF4	EF5
0	9	8	2	0	0	0

A storm system across the southern United States produced several tornadoes, primarily across Alabama as well as in Georgia. Ten tornadoes touched down in central Alabama, with one of the most powerful ones an EF2 with winds that reached 122 miles per hour (196 km/h). Along its path through Blount and St. Clair counties, 18 structures were damaged or destroyed, with four structures completely destroyed. Seven chicken houses were destroyed, displacing over 95,000 chickens. Another EF2 tornado, which started in Russell County and eventually moved into Columbus, Georgia, caused minor to moderate damage to over 100 structures, as well as damage to Columbus State University. Two people were killed in Morgan and Marshall counties, although only the Marshall County death was due to a tornado.

=== April 25–26 (United States and Canada) ===
EFU	EF0	EF1	EF2	EF3	EF4	EF5
0	12	6	3	0	0	0

A moderate risk of severe weather was issued for parts of western Oklahoma, southern Kansas and the Oklahoma and Texas panhandles on April 25. Late that evening, a series of supercells formed in north-central Oklahoma, one of them producing a tornado that struck northern parts of Enid, Oklahoma and caused damage to the Chisholm Trail Coliseum and many houses. The storms in north-central Oklahoma continued to produce tornadoes into the early morning hours of April 26. One tornado, described as large and violent, touched down in Kremlin at about 1:45 am (0645 UTC). Both tornadoes were rated as EF2.

The same storm system and its associated cold front produced a bow echo that traveled through Michigan, most of Southern Ontario and parts of Southern Quebec where a second squall line formed in eastern Ontario. With the squall lines, one F0 tornado was confirmed by Environment Canada investigators in Ottawa, Ontario tracking about 5 kilometres (3.1 mi) through the Britannia, Lincoln Heights and Carlington Heights communities where it tore off the roofs of two apartment complexes, downed numerous trees, power lines and signs. Widespread heavy damage was reported elsewhere including to planes at the Rockcliffe Airport as well as trees, power lines, street signs and several other buildings including houses and a school elsewhere across the city and in Gatineau, Quebec due to winds locally at 100 kilometres per hour (62 mph). In a separate storm (though part of the same low-pressure system), another F0 tornado was confirmed in Windsor, Ontario damaging the roof of a CUPE union hall building.

On the morning of April 26, a high risk of severe weather was issued for much of Oklahoma into southern Kansas, where a major tornado outbreak was expected along the dryline. While several tornadoes were reported, overall activity was much less than expected and the high risk busted.

=== April 29 ===
EFU	EF0	EF1	EF2	EF3	EF4	EF5
0	12	8	1	0	0	0

Several areas of severe weather erupted in the central Plains with 16 tornado reports scattered from southern Kansas to southern Texas. A well documented event took place northeast of Lubbock near the town of Cedar Hill where several tornadoes touched down from a single storm. A pair of tornadoes also touched down in Arkansas doing some minor damage.

== May ==
There were 227 tornadoes reported in the US in May, of which 202 were confirmed.

=== May 2–3 ===
EFU	EF0	EF1	EF2	EF3	EF4	EF5
0	16	15	1	0	0	0

On May 2, an EF0 tornado hit Eggville, Mississippi where damage was reported as a slow-moving front continued southward. In Valley Ranch, Texas, the practice facility for the Dallas Cowboys was destroyed by a microburst, injuring several people. On May 3, a moderate risk of severe weather was issued for parts of Mississippi, Alabama, and Georgia, mainly for a threat of intense downburst winds. A major progressive derecho with widespread and extensive wind damage - as strong as 110 mph (175 km/h) at times - and embedded tornadoes has been confirmed rolling from East Texas all the way to Alabama with numerous reports of damage all across Louisiana, Mississippi and Alabama and into northern Georgia. At least one person was killed when a tree fell on her mobile home. A number of "large and extremely dangerous" tornadoes were reported in Alabama in the afternoon of May 3 by Storm Spotters and the NWS. Significant damage was reported near Moody, Pell City and Ragland in Blount and St. Clair Counties from this tornado according to ABC 33/40 coverage while tornadoes were reported in southern Jefferson County and northern Shelby County. Another reported tornado in Crossville, Tennessee resulted in significant damage and injuries. In total, 28 tornadoes have been confirmed, but all but one were weak.

=== May 5–6 ===
EFU	EF0	EF1	EF2	EF3	EF4	EF5
0	12	13	2	0	0	0

Strong thunderstorms resulted in damage to homes throughout North Carolina on May 5. During the afternoon, an EF0 tornado touched down in southern Lenoir County, peeling off three tin roofs off of turkey barns. About an hour later, an EF1 tornado ripped the roof off of a house and damaged several outbuildings in Pitt County. The most powerful tornado of the day was an EF2 that caused significant damage to several homes and injured one person in Wilson County. The next day, thunderstorms impacted sections of the Southern United States. An EF2 tornado struck the Madison, Alabama area, affecting three residential subdivisions and causing significant roof damage to several homes with others sustaining lesser damage including blown windows and minor roof damage.

=== May 8 ===
EFU	EF0	EF1	EF2	EF3	EF4	EF5
0	14	19	10	2	0	0

Another major severe weather event developed early on May 8 over southwestern Kansas. It quickly formed into a major progressive derecho which tracked across the central Plains, the Ozarks and into the Ohio Valley. The city of Joplin, Missouri had a derecho. It eventually became an F1 tornado destroying a TV station tower. Several tornadoes also developed, primarily in the Springfield, Missouri area where damage was reported. A moderate risk of severe weather was issued primarily due to the wind threat. Two people were killed near Poplar Bluff, Missouri when winds knocked a tree onto their car. Another Missouri resident suffered a fatal heart attack after he was blown away from his home and dropped into a field by an EF2 tornado. A woman was killed in southeastern Kansas after her mobile home was blown off its foundation. Two other deaths occurred in Kirksville, Kentucky from an EF3 tornado. Eventually, the storm developed a tropical cyclone-like structure, with a well-defined eye feature. In addition, winds were measured as high as 106 miles per hour (171 km/h) in Carbondale, Illinois.

=== May 13 ===
EFU	EF0	EF1	EF2	EF3	EF4	EF5
0	12	6	2	0	0	0

On the morning of May 11, the Storm Prediction Center issued a moderate risk for severe weather for central Missouri and central Illinois on their Day 3 Convective Outlook. This risk was kept in the Day 2 Convective Outlook, issued May 12. The outlook mentioned the possibility of strong tornadoes, large hail and a damaging wind threat for May 13. During the day, a supercell produced three tornadoes in Sullivan and Adair counties in Missouri. Sixty-one homes were damaged in Kirksville with 10 homes destroyed and 15 homes sustaining major damage. Another 150 buildings in Adair County were also damaged. Two people were killed near Kirksville and another person was killed northeast of Milan.

== June ==
There were 299 tornadoes reported in the US in June, of which 270 were confirmed.

=== June 3 (Russia) ===
A tornado hit Krasnozavodsk, a town in Sergiyevo-Posadsky District, injuring 65 others, of whom 25 had to be hospitalized, and causing 350 million Russian rubles in damage. Forty-two homes were damaged and the tornado was rated F3 (T6) by the European Severe Weather Database.

=== June 5 ===
EFU	EF0	EF1	EF2	EF3	EF4	EF5
0	3	0	1	0	0	0

On the afternoon of June 5, a large tornado was observed by researchers with the VORTEX 2 tornado research project in Goshen County, Wyoming, with the entire life cycle of the tornado being broadcast live on The Weather Channel as part of their coverage of the VORTEX2 project. The tornado was on the ground for approximately 25 minutes and became rain-wrapped at one point, eventually roping out and dissipating. The tornado stayed in open rural areas and damaged only a few trees and telephone poles. It was rated EF2 on the Enhanced Fujita Scale based upon Doppler weather radar measurements. This tornado was also featured on an episode of the Discovery Channel series Storm Chasers, wherein the TIV 2 and TornadoVideos.Net's "Dominator" vehicle both managed to penetrate the tornado with TIV 2 filming IMAX footage from inside the funnel.

=== June 6 (Italy) ===
EFU	EF0	EF1	EF2	EF3	EF4	EF5
0	1	0	1	1	0	0

A strong tornado stuck the city of Vallà, a town near Riese Pio X in the province of Treviso. It was classified as an EF3 (T6) tornado, but in some area of the city the tornado may have reached EF3-EF4 damage with some buildings razed to the ground. The tornado travelled for about 10 km and injured 28 people. Another tornado touched down near Vercelli and an F2-F3 tornado stuck the province of Pordenone, with some truck lifted off the ground, one of which was thrown into a building.

=== June 7 (Serbia) ===
A tornado that lasted five minutes hit Cantavir, a village in the province of Vojvodina, killing a nine-year-old boy, injuring several people and damaging more than 500 households. The tornado caused 4.5 million Serbian dinars in damage and was rated F1 (T3) by the European Severe Weather Database.

=== June 12 ===
EFU	EF0	EF1	EF2	EF3	EF4	EF5
0	3	8	1	0	0	0

An intense progressive derecho tracked across the Mid-South region of the United States. A few tornadoes were embedded in the system amidst widespread straight-line wind damage. The strongest tornado, an EF2, hit Olive Branch, Mississippi causing significant damage in the city. Along with straight-line wind, the tornado affected 693 single-family homes in DeSoto County, Mississippi. Of those, 377 had minor damage, 44 had major damage and two were destroyed. Twenty mobile homes had minor damage, two had major damage and two were destroyed. Ninety multi-family housing units had minor damage. There were also nine businesses in the county that had minor damage and seven had major damage.

=== June 15–16 ===
EFU	EF0	EF1	EF2	EF3	EF4	EF5
0	34	10	1	0	0	0

Amidst an active severe weather pattern, several areas of severe weather produced tornadoes across parts of the United States. On June 15, three tornadoes touched down in Colorado, with the strongest being an EF2 in Elbert County. Another tornado was also rated EF2 which affected areas near Macksville, Kansas. On June 16, two tornadoes impacted Cleveland County, North Carolina, destroying a machine shed, causing minor damage to homes and shifting the foundations of a couple of mobile homes. In Tollesboro, Kentucky, an EF1 tornado caused a modest amount of damage. A barn was destroyed with another damaged, three mobile homes were lifted off their foundation and minor structural damage occurred to homes and mobile homes. Also on June 16, a large tornado and possible satellite tornado were observed and documented by the TWISTEX research team just north of Menno, South Dakota. The tornado itself had no reported damage, but the associated winds on the south side of the tornado damaged a few buildings, trees, and signs in town.

=== June 17 ===
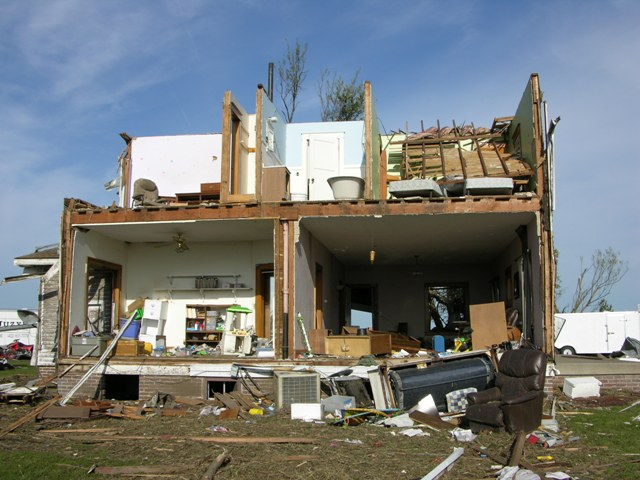
A home severely damaged by the EF2 Aurora, Nebraska tornado

EFU	EF0	EF1	EF2	EF3	EF4	EF5
0	13	2	2	0	0	0

Yet another round of severe weather developed on June 17 across the upper Midwest and central Great Plains. The community of Austin, Minnesota was especially hard hit by a large tornado. Between 15 and 20 homes were damaged and baseball fields were ruined across the city. About 600 trees were ripped down in city parks. It tracked over US 218, flipping numerous cars off the road. One shed was rolled several times by the tornado, injuring a man inside. The National Weather Service survey indicated that the tornado briefly reached EF2 intensity. The tornado was estimated to have touched down around 8:00 pm CDT and lifted around 8:23 pm CDT after tracking for 10 miles (16 km). The maximum width of the tornado was roughly 120 yards (110 m).

A separate round of tornadoes in Nebraska was also significant. A tornado emergency was later declared for Aurora, Nebraska as a large tornado was approaching town. The tornado downed power lines, nearly destroyed a dog food factory as it passed very close to the structure, and damaged several homes before dissipating. Storm chaser Reed Timmer of TornadoVideos.Net was pursuing this storm when his custom-built "Dominator" vehicle was struck by the tornado, the driver's window being destroyed and resulting in Reed and one of his passengers receiving lacerations from flying glass, the incident being shown in an episode of the Discovery Channel series Storm Chasers which was being filmed at the time. A historic home and barn were destroyed by the tornado and train cars were derailed. The most significant damage took place along Interstate 80. Severe damage was reported in a rural community about 5 miles (8.0 km) west of Aurora. The tornado was estimated to be a quarter mile (0.40 km) wide and was on the ground for about 18 minutes. The tornado was rated EF2 on the Enhanced Fujita Scale and had a track length of 5 miles (8.0 km). Footage of the tornado was also featured on TruTV's Adrenaline Rush Hour (2009) and the Weather Channel's Weather Caught On Camera (2011–2014).

=== June 19 ===
EFU	EF0	EF1	EF2	EF3	EF4	EF5
0	3	2	2	0	0	0

On June 19, three tornadoes touched down in western Michigan, destroying several buildings and uprooting trees. One tornado touched down 12 miles (19 km) east of Pullman for about six minutes. It was a quarter mile wide and lasted for about six minutes. The tornado took down several trees and partially destroyed a house, which had part of its roof torn off and a wall collapsed. A pole barn and a metal structure were completely destroyed, and a large barn was moved off its cinder blocks. That tornado was classified as an EF1. The second tornado touched down about 4 miles (6.4 km) northwest of Alamo. It was about 300 yards (270 m) wide and lasted about three minutes. It destroyed one building and numerous trees. It was classified as an EF2 tornado. The third tornado in Richland was about 300 yards (270 m) wide. It tore off a house's roof, throwing debris 100 yards (91 m). The home's insulation was found over a mile away. It also was classified as an EF2 tornado.

=== June 25 (Ontario) ===
EFU	EF0	EF1	EF2	EF3	EF4	EF5
0	0	1	1	0	0	0

Severe thunderstorms developed early in the morning of June 25 across the central Great Lakes and spread eastward. The most severe weather was in the area surrounding Lake Erie, with tornadoes reported on the Canadian shoreline, where at least one house was flattened and several other buildings were heavily damaged in Elgin County, Ontario. A second EF1 tornado was confirmed in Leamington where it tore the roof of a barn.

== July ==
There were 134 tornadoes reported in the US in July, of which 120 were confirmed.

=== July 8–9 ===
EFU	EF0	EF1	EF2	EF3	EF4	EF5
0	9	6	1	1	0	0

Severe weather developed late in the afternoon over eastern Montana and spread eastward in the evening into North Dakota, South Dakota and southern Saskatchewan and Manitoba. One notable tornado took place in the Dickinson, North Dakota area. The Dickinson tornado was rated EF3, where several houses were destroyed and many others heavily damaged in the southern part of the city. A few minor injuries were reported.

Another round of severe weather took place late on July 9 across the central Plains and northward. One tornado, rated F2 on the Fujita Scale, struck a fishing lounge, uprooting two cabins and dropping the buildings into a lake near Ear Falls, Ontario, resulting in three deaths and at least five others injured. The third victim was found July 12. All victims were from Ponca City, Oklahoma.

=== July 11 (Australia) ===
A low to moderate (high EF1 to low EF2) strength tornado, spawned by a small supercell struck the southern Adelaide town of Port Noarlunga, South Australia. Winds associated with the tornado reached up to 150 km/h, leaving a damage track 2.7 km long. At the western end, the tornado damaged five houses, demolished a shed, shifted cars, and hurled iron and glass debris across an oval during a football match between the Port Noarlunga Football Club and the Reynella Football Club. One person on the oval was injured. Substantial tree damage occurred along the eastern section of the track.

=== July 29 ===
EFU	EF0	EF1	EF2	EF3	EF4	EF5
0	6	0	2	0	0	0

Severe thunderstorms developed across the Northeastern United States and eastern Canada on July 29. The Cherry Valley area in Monroe County, Pennsylvania was hard hit by a likely tornado. Several buildings were heavily damaged, mostly commercial buildings. Several people were injured, but none seriously. The tornado was later confirmed as a rare EF2 tornado. The tornado tracked for roughly 5 miles (8.0 km) and grew to a width of 300 feet (91 m). At least two barns were destroyed and numerous trees were downed along its path. This tornado was one of 12 tornadoes to touch down in the county since 1950. In Cherry Valley, 25 power poles were downed, resulting in extensive internet and power outages. In eastern Quebec, an F0 tornado touched down in Quebec causing damage in the Duberger subdivision. Another Tornado was confirmed to have touched down on this date in Wantage, New Jersey leaving about a 7-mile path up into Unionville, New York. Winds were said to have reached up to 130 mph placing it as an EF2. Trees and power lines were downed and older wooden structures were destroyed in its path. Minor damage was reported to stronger buildings and homes. A third tornado, rated EF0, was confirmed in the area. Additionally, two EF0 tornadoes were confirmed in Maryland.

=== July 30 ===
EFU	EF0	EF1	EF2	EF3	EF4	EF5
0	5	5	2	0	0	0

Severe weather hit the Memphis, Tennessee Metropolitan area where widespread damage was reported. Portions of a facade of a KOHL's department store in Cordova was blown away. A restaurant and a car dealership also sustained heavy damage. A large tornado was photographed during the event. Over 12 000 customers in the Memphis area lost power. Damage was also reported in Olive Branch, Mississippi. The tornado was later rated as an EF1. A total of 50 homes were damaged along its path and 131,000 people lost power due to fallen power lines. The Olive Branch tornado was later confirmed as an EF2, tracking for 4 miles (6.4 km) and peaking in width at 300 yards (270 m). Seven homes and one business were destroyed and 113 other structures were damaged along its path. Two other EF0 tornadoes touched down in Arkansas and Louisiana. There was also unconfirmed reports of a tornado near Capron, Illinois that were associated with an isolated cell.

== June ==
=== June 23 (Philippines) ===
Two EF1 tornadoes were spawned by Tropical Storm Nangka (Feria). In Perez, Quezon, a boat with 15 passengers was struck by an EF1 tornado at around 01:00 PhST where it killed 4 people and injured 2 others. Another EF1 tornado hit four villages in Can-avid, Eastern Samar where it damaged 26 houses.

== August ==
There were 63 tornadoes reported in the US in August, of which 60 were confirmed.

=== August 4 ===
A large tornado struck the communities of Mont-Laurier and Aumond in southern Quebec about two hours north of Ottawa at around 2:30 PM EDT. Roofs were reported ripped off of homes, one large business had part of its wall blown away and one home was reported upended in Aumond. A total of 40 homes were damaged along the path and 21 of them had to be condemned. At least three people were reported injured by the tornado. A few hours after the tornado, a helicopter which filmed the damage caused by the tornado crashed on Highway 117 killing the pilot and a cameraman from CTV Montreal. The tornado was rated as an F2 making it one of the strongest and most damaging tornadoes in Quebec since an F3 struck Aylmer exactly 15 years ago to the day.

=== August 8 ===
EFU	EF0	EF1	EF2	EF3	EF4	EF5
0	2	2	0	0	0	0

Three tornadoes touched down east-central Minnesota and western Wisconsin. The first tornado occurred in the western suburbs of the Minneapolis – Saint Paul metropolitan area. It touched down shortly after 8:30 pm CDT in Minnetrista, and continued through Orono and Long Lake before dissipating in Plymouth. The EF1 tornado had a path of 9.5 miles (15.3 km) and was 200 yards (183 m) wide. It caused damage to trees, several residences, commercial buildings and boats. Two more tornadoes touched down approximately 90 minutes later in rural areas of western Wisconsin. An EF1 tornado touched down near Burkhardt, damaging several garages in that town and downing several hundred trees. This tornado had a path of 5 miles (8 km) and did not cause any injuries. A third tornado—rated EF0—touched down northwest of Hammond and caused only minimal damage.

=== August 15 (Philippines) ===
An EF1 tornado struck San Luis, Pampanga and killed a 7-month-old baby after her hammock that was attached to the roof was blown away. It was lifted as high as 9 m (30 ft) before it fell 10 m (32.8 ft) away from her house.

=== August 19–20 (United States and Canada) ===
EFU	EF0	EF1	EF2	EF3	EF4	EF5
0	25	17	6	1	0	0

On August 19, disturbances in the jet stream caused severe thunderstorms to form in Iowa and the Dakotas. The storms moved to the north and east during the day, spreading into Wisconsin and Minnesota. At 1:50 pm CDT, an EF0 tornado touched down in south Minneapolis, Minnesota, uprooting trees and causing minor structural damage. The tornado continued north-northwest for 4.5 miles (7 km) before dissipating near the Minneapolis Convention Center in downtown Minneapolis. CNN coverage showed significant tree damage near downtown. This was the first significant tornado to strike the city of Minneapolis since June 14, 1981. Ten additional tornadoes touched down in eastern Minnesota and western Wisconsin.

In Iowa, several EF1 tornadoes were reported east of Des Moines, with no damage reported except in Chesterton, Indiana (where an EF2 tornado hit) and Elburn. In Northern Illinois, near Peoria, other tornadoes were reported along a hook echo formation, causing heavy damage in Sangamon County, Illinois (where the strongest tornado of the outbreak - an EF3 - occurred) and Cook County, Illinois.

More tornadoes developed on August 20 over the central Great Lakes in Ontario. Eighteen tornadoes touched down, four of them producing at least F2 damage. The number of tornadoes associated with this event surpasses that of August 2, 2006, which was formerly the largest tornado outbreak in the history of Ontario. See Southern Ontario Tornado Outbreak of 2009. The first confirmed tornado cut a 36 km path from southwest of Durham to Markdale, was rated F2 and damaged dozens of homes and buildings. A tornado touched down at Clarksburg and was rated F2. This tornado had a 9 km path from south of Thornbury to the southeast, affecting Blue Mountain before passing onto Georgian Bay. Two separate tornadoes hit Vaughan; the first had a 3.5 km path through the Woodbridge neighborhood and was rated F2, while the second carved a 2.7 km path through the Maple neighborhood and was also rated F2. These two tornadoes each damaged dozens of homes, many with significant structural damage and a few requiring demolition. Another tornado in the GTA hit near Newmarket, causing serious F1 damage at the Royal Riding Academy. A tornado caused a 10 km long, 1 km wide path damage at Gravenhurst and was rated F0. An F1 tornado touched down at Milton causing roof and tree damage. At Redstone Lake in Haliburton County, an F0 damaged trees and cottages. Another tornado affected rural Haliburton County, with F1 tree damage at Haliburton Forest. From New Lowel to Edenvale, a tornado travelled 12.6 km, causing F1 damage to two homes and other farm buildings. Finally, two probable tornadoes occurred, one hitting Carlow/Mayo Township near Bancroft and causing F1 damage, the other producing F1 damage at Arnstein, near North Bay.

One death and some serious injuries occurred in Durham, mostly at a conservation area campground. The southern edge of Durham suffered heavy structural damage, including the complete destruction of a press plant, as well as serious damage to several more buildings in the town's small industrial park. In the Woodbridge and Maple areas of Vaughan just northwest of Toronto, the mayor declared a state of emergency for the city, 175 homes were evacuated because of heavy structural damage and some of those houses have been condemned, only minor injuries.

An EF0 tornado was also reported from the same system in Ross County, Ohio. In total, 49 tornadoes touched down over the two days.

== September ==
There were 10 tornadoes reported in the US in September, of which 8 were confirmed.

=== September 7-8 (South America) ===
FU	F0	F1	F2	F3	F4	F5
?	?	?	4	2	2	0

A deadly outbreak of tornadoes struck Argentina and Brazil on September 7. The deadliest tornado, rated F4 touched down in the Misiones Province, passing near the towns of Tobuna and San Pedro. Several homes were completely swept away, trees were completely debarked, and vehicles were mangled as the tornado moved through the area. The tornado killed 11 people. Argentinian President Cristina Fernandez de Kirchner visited the storm-strucken area soon afterwards. The same supercell spawned a second F4 tornado that hit Guaraciaba, in the Santa Carina state, Brazil. The tornado swept away many homes, killing four.

=== September 30 (Philippines) ===
EFU	EF0	EF1	EF2	EF3	EF4	EF5
0	0	6	0	0	0	0

The South Cotabato regional tornado outbreak is a series of Multiple EF1 tornadoes that struck the province. These tornadoes uprooted more than a hundred houses and damaged agricultural crops worth at least ₱10 million. A 15-year-old boy was injured in Koronadal after a tornado toppled a tree and hit him. The province was also previously hit by more than a dozen tornadoes since January.

== October ==
There were 69 tornadoes reported in the US in October, of which 65 were confirmed.

=== October 9 ===
EFU	EF0	EF1	EF2	EF3	EF4	EF5
0	7	5	2	0	0	0

After a very long lull in activity, severe weather developed again across parts of the Southern United States as a strong cold front moved through. Although most of the damage was due to straight-line winds, numerous tornadoes were confirmed, including an EF2 tornado that hit Casey County, Kentucky where houses were damaged and another EF2 tornado hit Monroe County, Kentucky. Another tornado near Wayside, Mississippi resulted in one fatality and two injuries when a mobile home was destroyed. It was rated EF1. In total, at least 12 tornadoes were confirmed across the South.

=== October 29–30 ===
EFU	EF0	EF1	EF2	EF3	EF4	EF5
0	18	12	3	0	0	0

A powerful front tracked through the south-central US on October 29 with a total of 33 tornadoes. The most significant damage was in Downtown Shreveport, Louisiana–for the second time in 2009–where structural damage to a church was reported. Damage was also reported in Magnolia, Arkansas and Pine Bluff. At least 25 tornadoes were confirmed in the Arklatex area north towards areas south of Little Rock, although most were weak. The severe weather caused at least one fatality indirectly due to a tornado in the Vivian area.

=== October 31 (Philippines) ===
A tornado that was spawn by Typhoon Mirinae (Santi) struck four villages in Ternate, Cavite at around 6:30 PhST. It damaged around 60 houses, and toppled electrical and telephone poles in the area. The tornado injured 10 people and led to the evacuation of at least 30 families.

== November ==
There were 4 tornadoes reported in the US in November, of which 3 were confirmed.

=== November 4 (United Kingdom) ===
On November 4, a tornado was reported in the Romsey area in Hampshire, UK. The tornado was reported due to roofs being torn off, although the tornado was confirmed as an F0.

== December ==
There were 52 tornadoes reported in the US in December, of which 48 were confirmed.

=== December 2 ===
EFU	EF0	EF1	EF2	EF3	EF4	EF5
0	4	2	1	0	0	0

A low pressure system with an associated mesolow tracked across the southern US on December 2. Several tornadoes have been reported, with significant damage across parts of Georgia. Two people were injured and houses were destroyed from an EF2 tornado in Appling County, Georgia. In total, seven tornadoes were confirmed.

=== December 19 ===
On December 19, a tornado touched down in downtown Hamilton, Bermuda. It created a swath of damage from Pitt's Bay road to First Avenue in the Cavendish Heights area of Pembroke. Hardest hit areas included the commercial areas of Reid Street from Queen Street to Court Street, and parts of Bermudiana Road. Automated recording stations on Hinson's Island reported a pressure drop of 20mb from 1016mb to 996mb. Along with this, a gust over 60kts was recorded. Although there were no reports of serious injuries, many tree branches came down, and, in some cases, whole trees were snapped. A row of motorcycles was knocked down during the severe storm. The tornado was likely between EF1 and EF2 at its peak. However, it is hard to accurately judge the strength of a tornado on the EF scale because of differences in Bermudian building codes.

=== December 23–24 ===
EFU	EF0	EF1	EF2	EF3	EF4	EF5
0	15	7	5	1	0	0

Numerous tornadoes touched down across Texas and Louisiana starting late on December 23 into December 24, associated with the warm sector of a much larger winter storm which produced heavy snow and blizzard conditions farther north. Significant damage was reported in the areas of Longview (where an EF2 tornado touched down), Lufkin (where an EF3 tornado touched down) and Garrison in Texas and in Crowley, Louisiana (tornado rated as EF2 there) where houses were heavily damaged as supercells developed ahead of and within a larger squall line.

A moderate risk of severe weather was issued for the afternoon of December 24 across the northern Gulf Coast. Severe activity was limited to the immediate coastal area with supercells embedded within the larger squall line, where a single EF0 tornado was reported.

== See also ==
- Weather of 2009
- Tornado
  - Tornadoes by year
  - Tornado records
  - Tornado climatology
  - Tornado myths
- List of tornado outbreaks
  - List of F5 and EF5 tornadoes
  - List of F4 and EF4 tornadoes
  - List of North American tornadoes and tornado outbreaks
  - List of 21st-century Canadian tornadoes and tornado outbreaks
  - List of European tornadoes and tornado outbreaks
  - List of tornadoes and tornado outbreaks in Asia
  - List of Southern Hemisphere tornadoes and tornado outbreaks
  - List of tornadoes striking downtown areas
  - List of tornadoes with confirmed satellite tornadoes
- Tornado intensity
  - Fujita scale
  - Enhanced Fujita scale
  - International Fujita scale
  - TORRO scale
