= Melor (disambiguation) =

Melor is a Breton saint.

Melor may also refer to:

- Melor Sturua, Russian journalist
- Melor (state constituency), Kelantan, Malaysia
- Typhoon Melor (disambiguation)

== See also ==
- Mellor
