= List of storms named Santi =

The name Santi has been used for two tropical cyclones in the Philippine Area of Responsibility by PAGASA in the Western Pacific Ocean. It replaced the unused name Sibak following the 2001 Pacific typhoon season.

- Typhoon Mirinae (2009) (T0921, 23W, Santi) – made landfall on Luzon, Philippines, and later Southern Vietnam.
- Typhoon Nari (2013) (T1325, 24W, Santi) – a strong and deadly tropical cyclone that struck the Philippines and Vietnam.

The name Santi was retired following the 2013 Pacific typhoon season and was replaced with Salome.
