= List of storms named Lupit =

The name Lupit (Tagalog: lupit, [lʊˈpɪt̚]) has been used for four tropical cyclones in the western North Pacific Ocean. The name was contributed by the Philippines and means "cruelty" or "brutality" in Tagalog.

- Typhoon Lupit (2003) (T0321, 26W, Yoyoy) – a Category 5 super typhoon that caused moderate damage in Micronesia.
- Typhoon Lupit (2009) (T0920, 22W, Ramil) – an erratic Category 5 super typhoon that recurved off Luzon.
- Tropical Storm Lupit (2016) (T1602, 04W) – not a threat to land.
- Tropical Storm Lupit (2021) (T2109, 13W, Huaning) – a weak storm that affected Southeast China, Taiwan and Japan.

Preceded by Nepartak	Pacific typhoon season names Lupit	Succeeded by Mirinae
