= List of storms named Salome =

The name Salome has been used for three tropical cyclones worldwide.

In the Central Pacific:

- Hurricane Hiki-Salome (1950) - affected Hawaii; was designated from the Pacific typhoon naming lists by the Air Weather Service from Guam

In the Western Pacific:

The name has been used for two tropical cyclones in the Philippine Area of Responsibility by PAGASA. It replaced the name Santi after it was retired following the 2013 Pacific typhoon season.

- Tropical Storm Haikui (2017) (T1724, 30W, Salome) – a weak tropical storm which caused minor impacts in the Philippines, South China, and Central Vietnam.
- Tropical Depression Salome (2025) – affected Taiwan and the Philippines. Recognized by PAGASA as a Tropical Storm.

Preceded by Ramil	Pacific typhoon season names Salome	Succeeded by Tala
