= Typhoon Nepartak (2003) =

Pacific typhoon in 2003

Typhoon Nepartak (Weng)
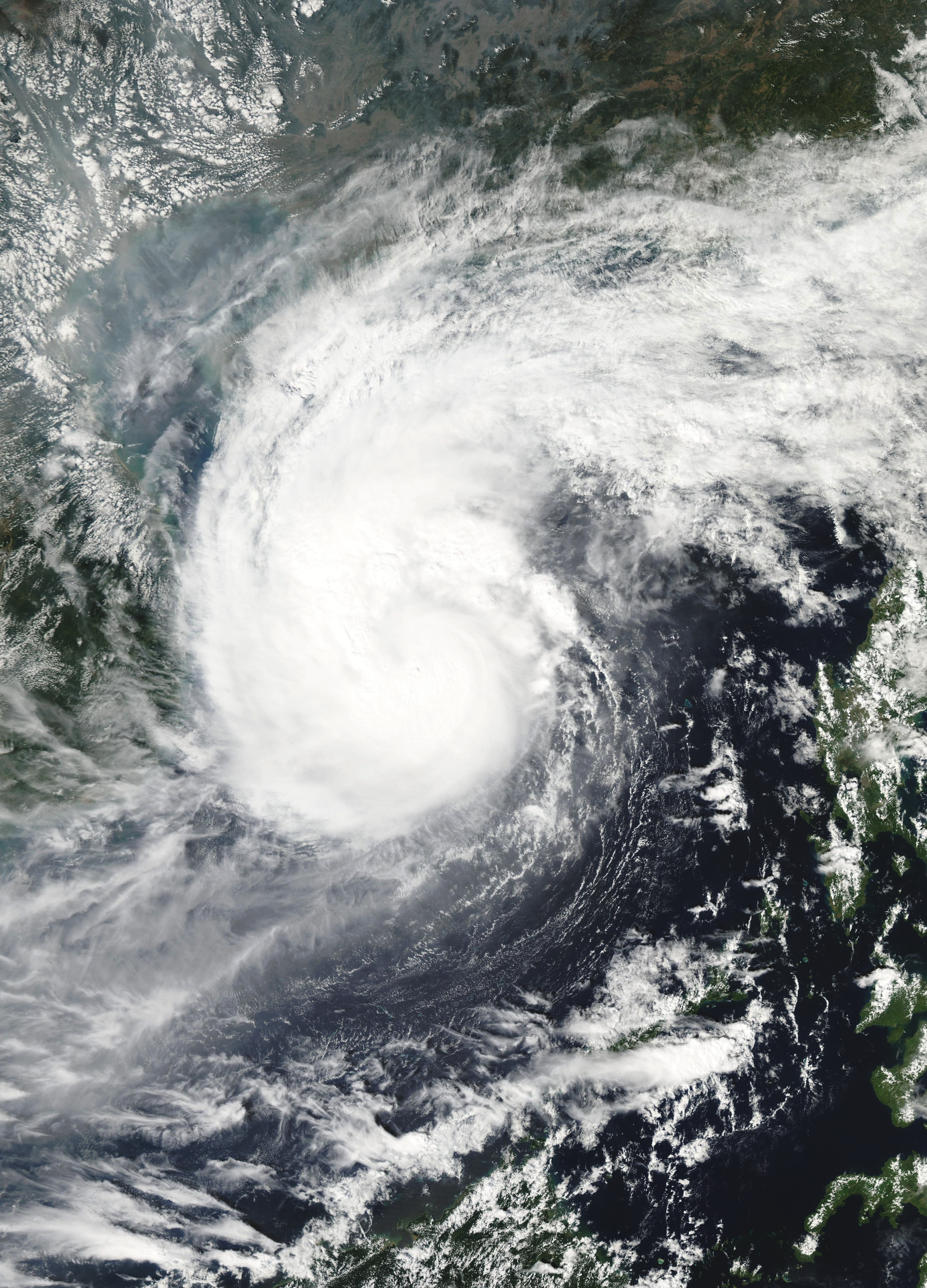
- Nepartak at peak intensity on November 16

Meteorological history
- Formed: November 11, 2003
- Dissipated: November 19, 2003

Typhoon
- 10-minute sustained (JMA)
- Highest winds: 120 km/h (75 mph)
- Lowest pressure: 970 hPa (mbar); 28.64 inHg

Category 1-equivalent typhoon
- 1-minute sustained (SSHWS/JTWC)
- Highest winds: 140 km/h (85 mph)
- Lowest pressure: 967 hPa (mbar); 28.56 inHg

Overall effects
- Fatalities: 13 total
- Damage: $197 million (2003 USD)
- Areas affected: Philippines, Hainan
- IBTrACS
- Part of the 2003 Pacific typhoon season

Typhoon Nepartak, (Note: The name Nepartak (Kosraean: Nepartak, [nepaːɽtaːk]) was contributed by the Federated States of Micronesia and refers to a legendary Kosraean warrior who conquered Pohnpei.) known in the Philippines as Typhoon Weng, was a modest tropical cyclone that struck the central Philippines and the southern China island of Hainan in mid November 2003. Forming as a tropical depression on November 11 between Yap and Guam, the system moved westward and slowly intensified. It received the name Nepartak midday on November 12 from the Japan Meteorological Agency, becoming the 20th named storm of the 2003 Pacific typhoon season. On November 13, Nepartak struck Samar in the Philippines and bisected the island chain. Up to four million people lost power, and transportation ground to a halt; over 5,000 individuals became stranded on ships forced to stay in port during the tropical storm. It was reported that 13 individuals died in the storm in the Philippines.

After entering the open waters of the South China Sea, Nepartak continued to intensify and turned more toward the northwest. It attained its peak intensity on November 16, with maximum 10-minute sustained winds of 120 km/h (75 mph) and 1-minute winds of 140 km/h (87 mph). (Note: The Japan Meteorological Agency uses 10-minute sustained winds, while the Joint Typhoon Warning Center uses 1-minute sustained winds. The conversion factor between the two is 1.14.) After weakening slightly, the storm found a weakness in the easterly steering currents and bore north, reintensifying slightly and directly striking southwestern Hainan. There, heavy rainfall and strong winds destroyed crops, livestock, and hundreds of homes, leaving $197 million (2003 USD) in damage. The storm rapidly deteriorated in the Gulf of Tonkin and dissipated as it neared mainland China.

== Meteorological history ==
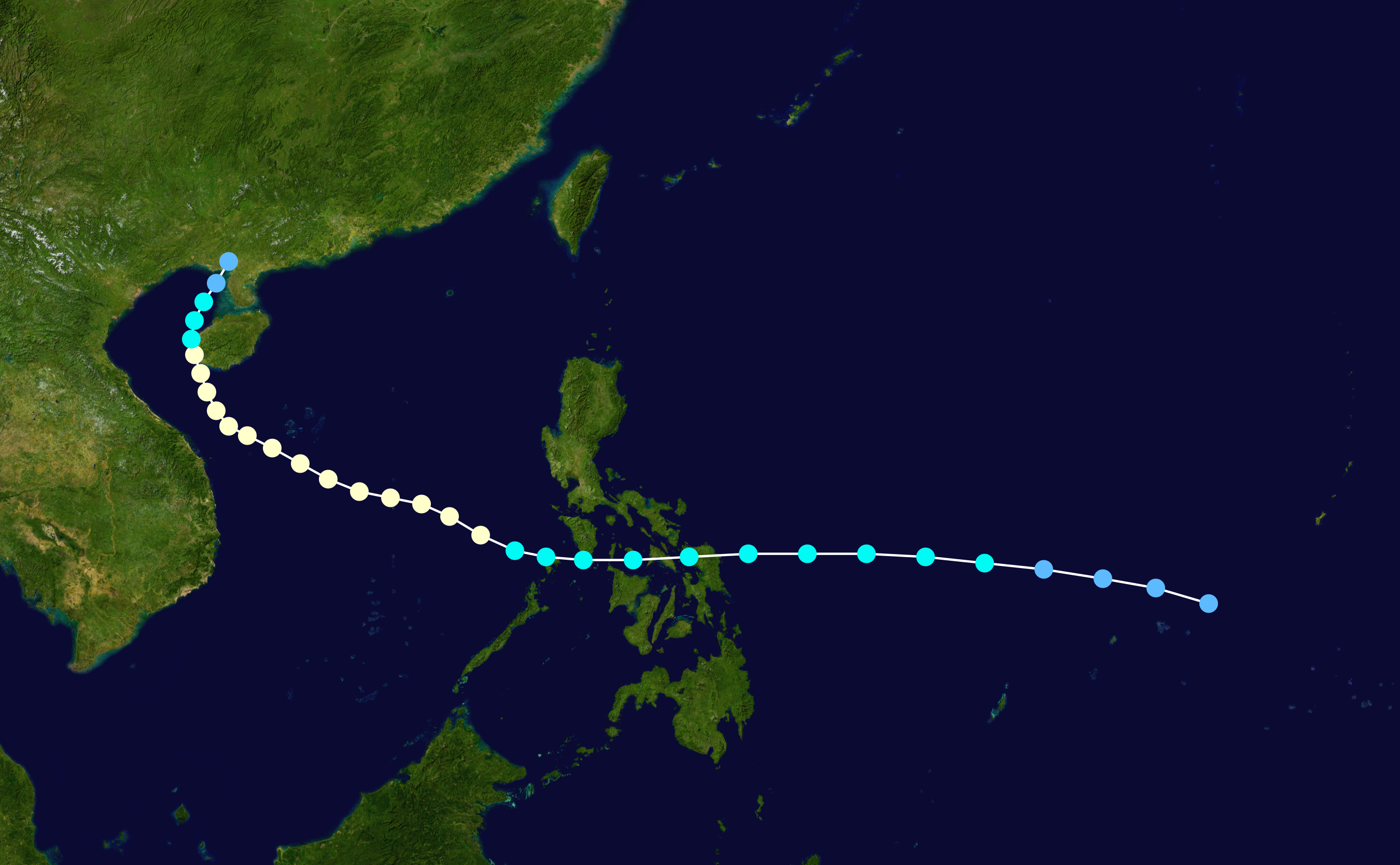
Map plotting the storm's track and intensity, according to the Saffir–Simpson scale Map key Saffir–Simpson scale Tropical depression (≤38 mph, ≤62 km/h) Tropical storm (39–73 mph, 63–118 km/h) Category 1 (74–95 mph, 119–153 km/h) Category 2 (96–110 mph, 154–177 km/h) Category 3 (111–129 mph, 178–208 km/h) Category 4 (130–156 mph, 209–251 km/h) Category 5 (≥157 mph, ≥252 km/h) Unknown Storm type Tropical cyclone Subtropical cyclone Extratropical cyclone, remnant low, tropical disturbance, or monsoon depression

Nepartak originated in a region of strong thunderstorm activity, associated with a broad trough of low surface pressure, which was situated around 640 km (400 mi) southeast of Guam by 0000 UTC on November 11. With weak wind shear and modest divergence of air over the system, it began to mature, although initially the Joint Typhoon Warning Center (JTWC) (Note: The Joint Typhoon Warning Center is a joint United States Navy – United States Air Force task force that issues tropical cyclone warnings for the western Pacific Ocean and other regions.) downplayed the potential for tropical cyclogenesis. Over the next several hours, a low-level circulation center became evident and convection organized around it, prompting the JTWC to issue an updated outlook. At 1800 UTC, the Japan Meteorological Agency (JMA) (Note: The Japan Meteorological Agency is the official Regional Specialized Meteorological Center for the western Pacific Ocean.) classified the storm as a tropical depression while it was located northeast of Yap in the Caroline Islands. The JTWC issued a tropical cyclone formation alert for the system at 2030 UTC, and designated it Tropical Depression 25W at 1200 UTC on November 12. The system intensified gradually as it began to track quickly westward toward the Philippines.

The depression had found its way to the southwestern quadrant of a large anticyclone aloft, allowing for continued strengthening. Both the JMA and the JTWC upgraded the system to a tropical storm midday on November 12, when it gained the name Nepartak from the JMA. Simultaneously, the cyclone entered the area of responsibility of the Philippine Atmospheric, Geophysical and Astronomical Services Administration, which named it Tropical Storm Weng. Meteorologically, the storm began to exhibit improved outflow and deepening convection as it neared the central Philippines. At around 1600 UTC on November 13, Nepartak made landfall on northern Samar Island in the Philippines before traversing the remainder of the archipelago from east to west. The cyclone emerged into the South China Sea briefly weakened and with reduced forward motion, but quickly resumed its intensification trend as it turned more toward the northwest. Shortly thereafter—at 0000 UTC on November 15—the JTWC further upgraded 25W to a typhoon.

Continuing generally toward the west-northwest under steering currents from a mid-level ridge to its north, Nepartak maintained its windspeeds throughout the day. With an improving appearance on satellite imagery, however, the storm gained some additional strength, and the JTWC estimated 25W to have attained its first peak intensity with maximum 1‑minute sustained winds of 140 km/h (87 mph) at 0000 UTC on November 16. Later that day, the JMA determined Nepartak to have reached maximum 10-minute winds of 120 km/h (75 mph), placing it at typhoon status. The cyclonic envelope began to ingest dry air from its surroundings, and convection began to wane, leading to slight weakening as the storm approached the island of Hainan. A shortwave trough soon cut a weakness in the mid-level ridge which had previously suppressed Nepartak to the south, allowing the cyclone to curve north and enhancing outflow over the storm. By late on November 17, a small eye feature about 19 km (12 mi) in diameter had formed, and at 0000 UTC the next day it was situated just offshore southwestern Hainan.

The cyclone's 1-minute winds increased once again to 140 km/h, marking its second and final peak at 0000 UTC on November 18. The JMA, however, maintained Nepartak as a severe tropical storm. The JTWC indicated that 25W made a second landfall on the coast of Hainan, although the JMA did not make such mention, implying Nepartak's center remained over the Gulf of Tonkin. Regardless, the cyclone's circulation had obscured most of Hainan and the Gulf of Tonkin and reached into adjacent Vietnam, and its forward speed slowed to a crawl. Extended interaction with land proved detrimental to the storm, and it began to rapidly disintegrate. Just 18 hours after its final bout of strengthening, Nepartak had been reduced to an exposed circulation center with no associated thunderstorms. Turning toward the northeast, the system had been concurrently downgraded to a tropical depression by the JTWC and JMA early on November 19. The weak remnant low of Nepartak limped ashore over Beihai, China at 1900 UTC and dissipated shortly thereafter.

== Impact ==
=== Philippines ===
On its first landfall, the tropical storm buffeted the eastern-central Philippines with damaging winds gusting up to 160 km/h (99 mph), heavy rainfall, and rough seas. At least 20 provinces experienced adverse or dangerous weather, with the worst conditions concentrated over the islands of Samar and Masbate. While structural and crop damages were limited, local infrastructure and transportation suffered the greatest. Nepartak's winds caused complete power outages on Samar, Masbate, and nearby Marinduque, affecting their entire collective population of nearly four million individuals. Many schools were closed. The storm forced the cancellation of nearly two dozen domestic flights to and from the region, and at least 120 ferries and other vessels sought shelter in ports around the Manila, Bicol, and Visayas regions. On those ships were more than 5,000 people who became stranded until safe passage could be made. By November 15, five deaths had been confirmed in the Philippines, four the result of electrocutions from downed powerlines. Immediately following the disaster, President Gloria Macapagal Arroyo made assisting the stranded passengers in coastal ports a priority. According to the PAGASA in its post-storm report, a total of 13 people died, 5 others remained unaccounted for, and 11 sustained injuries. One newspaper reported that a motorized craft in the Tañon Strait capsized at the height of the storm, forcing the rescue of 11 people. Another source also describes the sinking of a boat with at least 13 survivors and one fatality. It is not clear whether these accounts cover the same incident.

=== Hainan ===
Nepartak inflicted widespread destruction on Hainan, including damage to farms and buildings. Most of the island was subject to strong winds and torrential rains, but the storm helped to relieve one of the worst summer droughts in almost 65 years. Due to the danger, shipping was halted in the Qiongzhou Strait between November 16 and 19. Nepartak impacted at least 1.72 million people on Hainan, compromised infrastructure, and impeded industry. The storm halted the operation of mines and rendered 72 highways temporarily unusable. Crops suffered extensively; 64,000 ha (160,000 acres) of fields were damaged, reducing grain production by as much as 3,200 tons. In addition, 400 head of livestock were lost to the typhoon. With about 800 homes destroyed, damage on Hainan amounted to $197 million (2003 USD), and no fatalities were reported. Following the storm, a young male sperm whale weighing over 500 kg (1,100 lb) washed ashore near Dongfang City on the island's southern shore, and died shortly after. Biologists speculated that the whale's demise may have been related to typhoon, although this was not confirmed.

By the time the storm had begun to abate over Hainan, it was already nearly dissipated, and as a result produced few, if any, noticeable effects in mainland China. Across the Gulf of Tonkin, Vietnam had experienced deadly flooding in the week before Nepartak's approach, and the typhoon initially raised concerns about worsening the situation. Officials made preparations to minimize potentially exacerbating factors, and the cyclone remained far enough east to avoid seriously impacting the country.

== See also ==
- Tropical cyclones in 2003
- Weather of 2003
- Other tropical cyclones named Nepartak
- Tropical Storm Mangkhut (2013)
- Typhoon Son-Tinh (2012)
- Typhoon Conson (2010)
- Tropical Storm Wutip (2025)
