= List of storms named Mirinae =

The name Mirinae (Korean: 미리내, [miɾinæ]) has been used for three tropical cyclones in the western North Pacific Ocean. The name was contributed by South Korea and means Milky Way in the Jeju language. It replaced the name Sudal (Korean: 수달, [sʰuda̠ɭ]), meaning Eurasian otter in Korean, after it was retired following the 2004 Pacific typhoon season.

- Typhoon Mirinae (2009) (T0921, 23W, Santi) – made landfall on Luzon, Philippines, and later Southern Vietnam.
- Severe Tropical Storm Mirinae (2016) (T1603, 05W) – category 1 typhoon that made landfall on Hainan, China, and later on Northern Vietnam.
- Severe Tropical Storm Mirinae (2021) (T2110, 14W, Gorio) – remained out to sea.

Preceded by Lupit	Pacific typhoon season names Mirinae	Succeeded by Nida
