= List of storms named Cempaka =

The name Cempaka (Malay: cempaka, [t͡ʃəmpakə]) has been used for three tropical cyclones worldwide: one in the Australian region and two in the western North Pacific Ocean. In the Western Pacific, where it replaced Melor after 2015, the name was contributed by Malaysia and means champak (Magnolia champaca) in Malay.

In the Western Pacific:

- Typhoon Cempaka (2021) (T2107, 10W) – a fairly long-lived cyclone that caused substantial damage in China and Vietnam.
- Typhoon Cempaka (2026) (T2632, 31W, Samuel) – a Category 2 typhoon that churned in the open ocean.

Preceded by In-fa	Pacific typhoon season names Cempaka	Succeeded by Nepartak

In the Australian region:

- Cyclone Cempaka (2017) – a weak system that caused flooding and landslides in Indonesia.
