= List of storms named Nepartak =

The name Nepartak (Kosraean: Nepartak, [nepaːɽtaːk]) has been used for four tropical cyclones in the Western Pacific Ocean. The name was contributed by the Federated States of Micronesia and refers to a legendary Kosraean warrior who conquered Pohnpei.

- Typhoon Nepartak (2003) (T0320, 25W, Weng) – struck the Philippines and China
- Tropical Storm Nepartak (2009) (T0919, 21W) – remained out to sea
- Typhoon Nepartak (2016) (T1601, 02W, Butchoy) – a very powerful storm which impacted Taiwan and devastated East China
- Tropical Storm Nepartak (2021) (T2108, 11W) – a weak storm which affected Japan; JTWC classified it as Subtropical Storm

Preceded by Cempaka	Pacific typhoon season names Nepartak	Succeeded by Lupit
