= Typhoon Nari (2013) =

Pacific typhoon in 2013

Typhoon Nari (Santi)
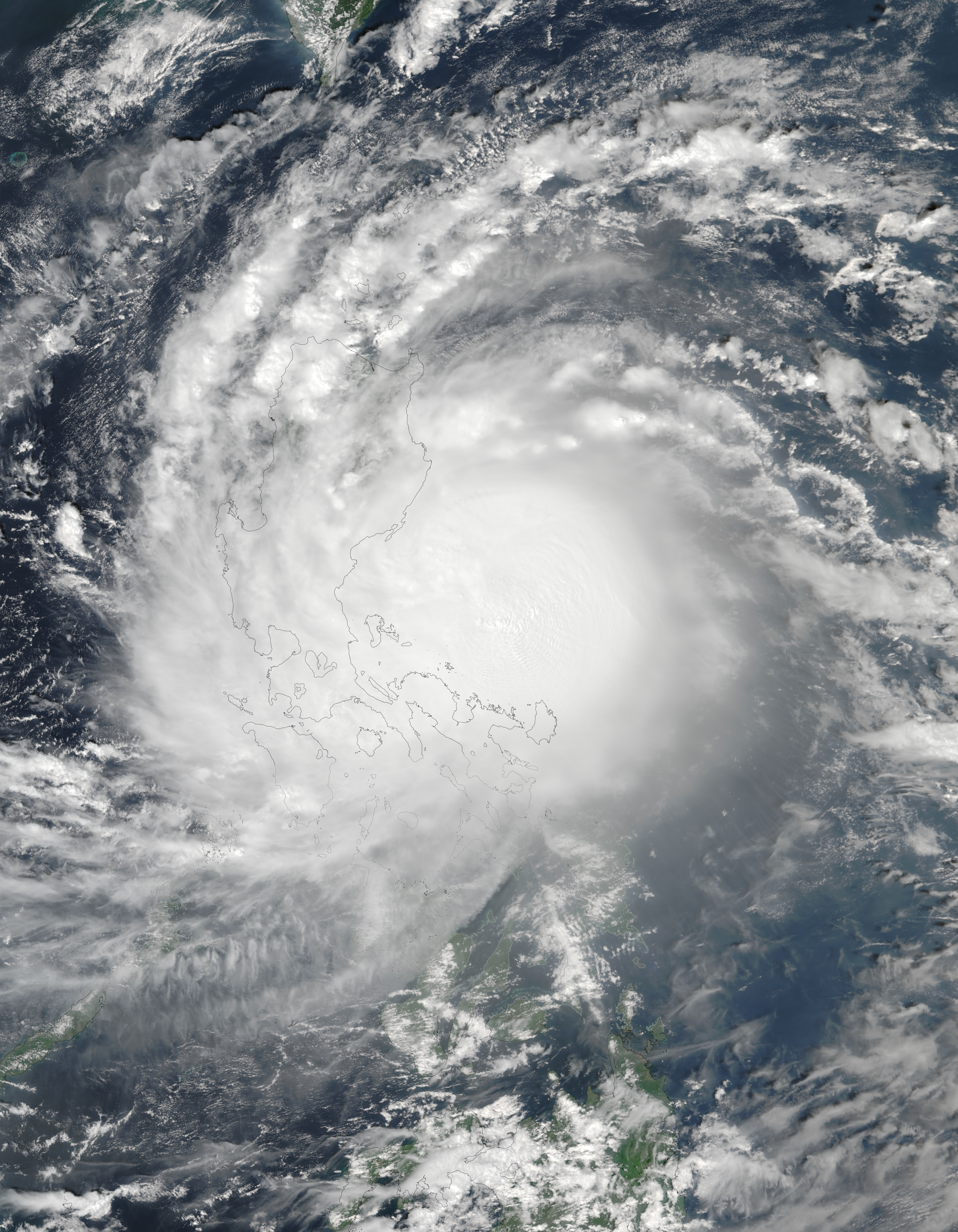
- Typhoon Nari approaching the Philippines on October 11

Meteorological history
- Formed: October 8, 2013
- Dissipated: October 16, 2013

Typhoon
- 10-minute sustained (JMA)
- Highest winds: 140 km/h (85 mph)
- Lowest pressure: 965 hPa (mbar); 28.50 inHg

Category 3-equivalent typhoon
- 1-minute sustained (SSHWS/JTWC)
- Highest winds: 185 km/h (115 mph)
- Lowest pressure: 948 hPa (mbar); 27.99 inHg

Overall effects
- Fatalities: 94 total
- Damage: $290 million (2013 USD)
- Areas affected: Philippines, Vietnam, Laos, Thailand, Cambodia
- IBTrACS
- Part of the 2013 Pacific typhoon season

Typhoon Nari, (Note: The name Nari (Korean: 나리, [ˈna̠(ː)ɾi]) was contributed by South Korea and means lily in Korean.) named Santi by PAGASA, was a strong and deadly tropical cyclone that first struck Luzon before striking Indochina in mid October 2013. The storm was the 41st depression and the 8th typhoon in the 2013 typhoon season.

== Meteorological history ==
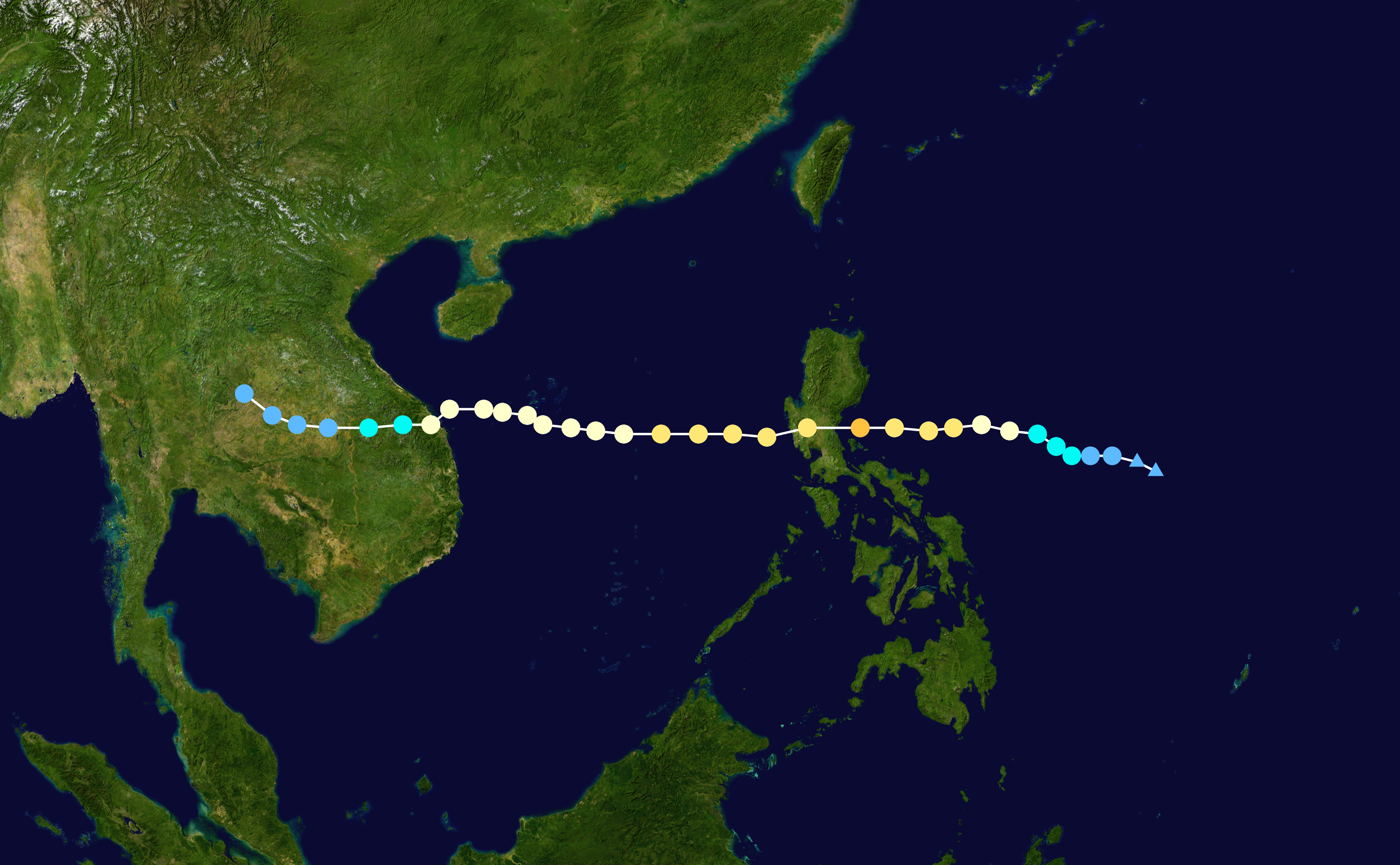
Map plotting the storm's track and intensity, according to the Saffir–Simpson scale Map key Saffir–Simpson scale Tropical depression (≤38 mph, ≤62 km/h) Tropical storm (39–73 mph, 63–118 km/h) Category 1 (74–95 mph, 119–153 km/h) Category 2 (96–110 mph, 154–177 km/h) Category 3 (111–129 mph, 178–208 km/h) Category 4 (130–156 mph, 209–251 km/h) Category 5 (≥157 mph, ≥252 km/h) Unknown Storm type Tropical cyclone Subtropical cyclone Extratropical cyclone, remnant low, tropical disturbance, or monsoon depression

On October 8, 2013 the Japan Meteorological Agency (JMA) started to monitor a tropical depression, that developed within an area of low to moderate vertical windshear, about 1,150 km (715 mi) to the east of Manila on the Philippine island of Luzon. The system was subsequently named Santi by the Philippine Atmospheric, Geophysical and Astronomical Services Administration (PAGASA) as it moved along the southern edge of a subtropical ridge of high pressure.

Later that day the United States Joint Typhoon Warning Center (JTWC) initiated advisories on the system and designated it as Tropical Depression 24W after the systems low level circulation center had started to consolidate.

During the next day after central convection over the systems low level circulation centre had increased both the JMA and the JTWC reported that the depression had developed into a tropical storm, with the latter naming it as Nari. Nari ensued a period of rapid intensification in the Philippine Sea, with the Japan Meteorological Agency and PAGASA upgrading the system into a typhoon. Nari became a Category 3 major typhoon as it smashed ashore into Dingalan, Aurora. Power outages affected much of Central Luzon as the typhoon crossed the region. Five people were killed by falling trees and landslides from Nari as it weakened to a Category 2 typhoon on October 12. With land interaction, Nari weakened to a Severe Tropical Storm during October 13. Late on October 14, the system affected Vietnam and made landfall later that day. Due to land interaction, Nari weakened to an remnant low. Early on October 16, both the JMA and JTWC issued their final warnings on Nari, as the system dissipated. Within the Philippines a total of 15 people were left dead while 5 were missing, while total economic losses were amounted to be Php 12.3 billion (US$277.34 million).

== Preparations and impact ==
=== Philippines ===
During October 9, PAGASA issued the public storm warning signal number 1 for the island province of Catanduanes, before expanding the areas under Signal 1 early the next day to include Aurora, Camarines Norte, Camarines Sur, Isabela, the Polillo Islands and Quezon. Later that day after the system had intensified into a typhoon and accelerated slightly towards the Philippines slightly, PAGASA placed 17 areas in Luzon under Signal 1, 14 areas under Signal 2 and Aurora Province under Signal 3. During October 11, the areas under signal 3 were expanded to include Benguet, Ifugao, Ilocos Sur, Isabela, La Union, Pangasinan, Polillo Island, Quirino, Nueva Ecija and Tarlac. Over the next day, the warnings were gradually revised before they were all subsequently cancelled during October 12, as the system moved out of the Philippine Area of Responsibility and was moving towards Vietnam.

Within the Philippines a total of 15 people were left dead while 5 were missing, while total economic losses were amounted to be PHP3.3 billion (US$77 million).

=== Vietnam ===
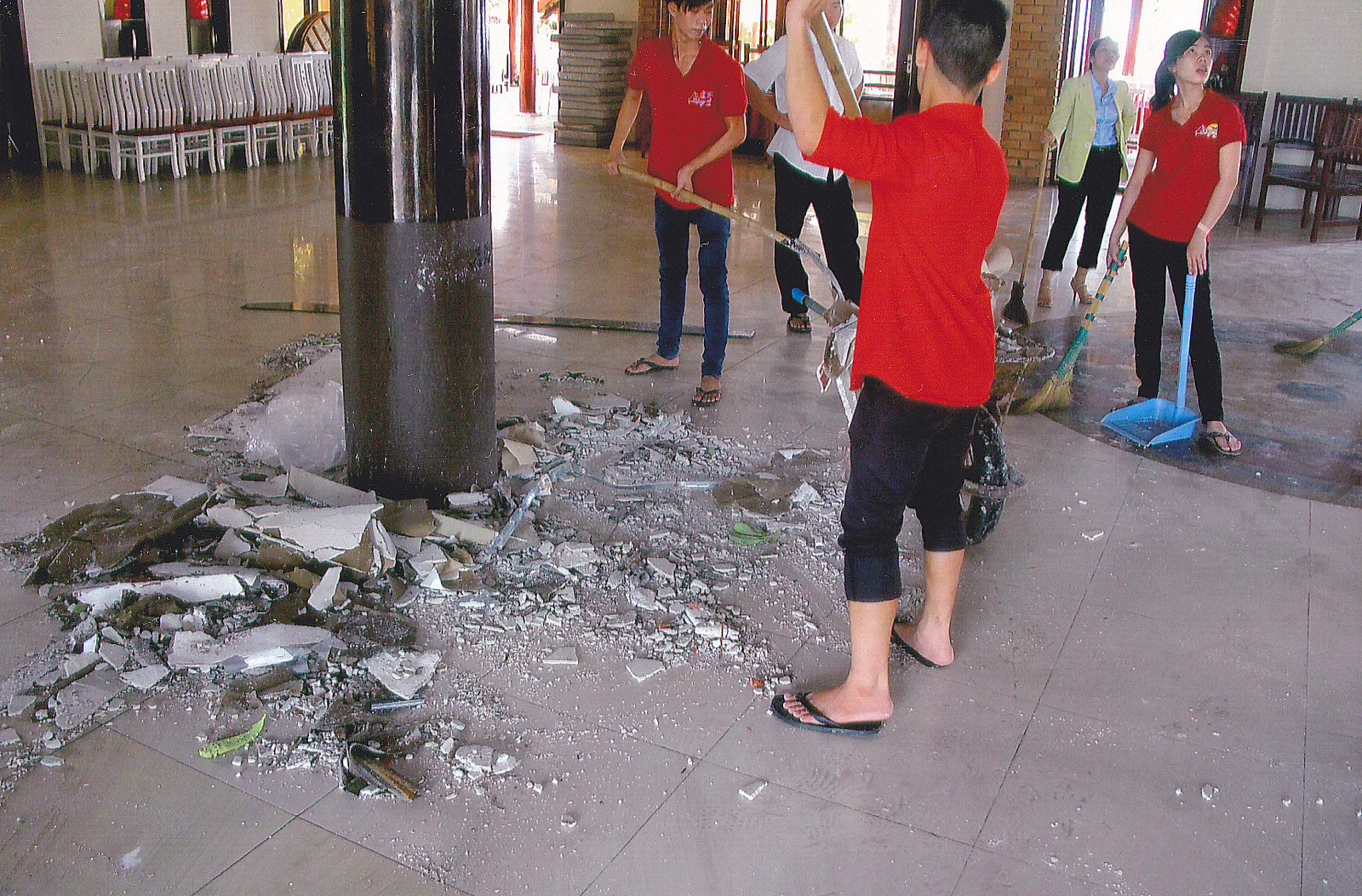
Damages in Vietnam

In advance of the typhoon, more than 122,000 residents were evacuated from vulnerable provinces to higher grounds. In Danang, soldiers were sent to help people readily secure their homes against the expected winds and guide ships to shelter. Thousands of travelers were left stranded as Vietnam Airlines cancelled over a dozen flights. In total Nari caused 26 deaths and economic losses of 4,315 billion VND (US$204.5 million, 2013).

=== Laos ===
On October 16, poor weather from the remnants of Typhoon Nari has been cited as a probable cause for the crash of Lao Airlines Flight 301, on approach to Pakse International Airport with the loss of all 49 passengers and crew. Another 4 people were killed directly due to the storm.

=== China ===
Total damages in China were counted to be CN¥50 million (US$8.19 million).

== Retirement ==
PAGASA announced that the name Santi would be retired from its naming lists after it had caused over ₱1 billion in damages. PAGASA chose the name Salome to replace Santi for the 2017 season.

== See also ==
- Typhoon Vongfong (2020)
- Tropical Depression 18W (2013)
- Typhoon Ketsana
- Typhoon Mirinae (2009)
- Typhoon Xangsane
- Typhoon Wutip (2013)
- Typhoon Vamco
- Typhoon Noru
