= Guaraciaba, Santa Catarina =

Municipality in Brazil

- Municipality
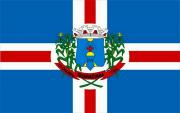
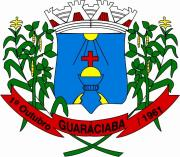
- Flag Coat of arms
- Interactive map of Guaraciaba, Santa Catarina
- Country: Brazil
- Time zone: UTC−3 (BRT)

Location of Guaraciaba within Santa Catarina and of Santa Catarina within Brazil.

Guaraciaba is a municipality situated in the state of Santa Catarina, Brazil, with an estimated population in 2020 of 10,026 inhabitants. It is located in 26°35′56″ S and 53°31′04″ W and 720 metres (2,360 ft) above sea level.
