= List of storms named Melor =

The name Melor (Malay: melor, [məˈlor]) has been used for three tropical cyclones in the western North Pacific Ocean. The name was contributed by Malaysia and means an Arabian jasmine in Malay.

- Severe Tropical Storm Melor (2003) (T0319, 24W, Viring) – A Category 1 typhoon that affected the Philippines, Taiwan and Japan.
- Typhoon Melor (2009) (T0918, 20W, Quedan) – A Category 5 typhoon that struck Japan.
- Typhoon Melor (2015) (T1527, 28W, Nona) – A late season Category 4 typhoon that struck the Philippines

The name Melor was retired following the 2015 Pacific typhoon season and was replaced with Cempaka (Malay: cempaka, [t͡ʃəmpakə]), which means champak (Magnolia champaca) in Malay.
