= Typhoon Mirinae (2009) =

Pacific typhoon in 2009

Typhoon Mirinae (Santi)
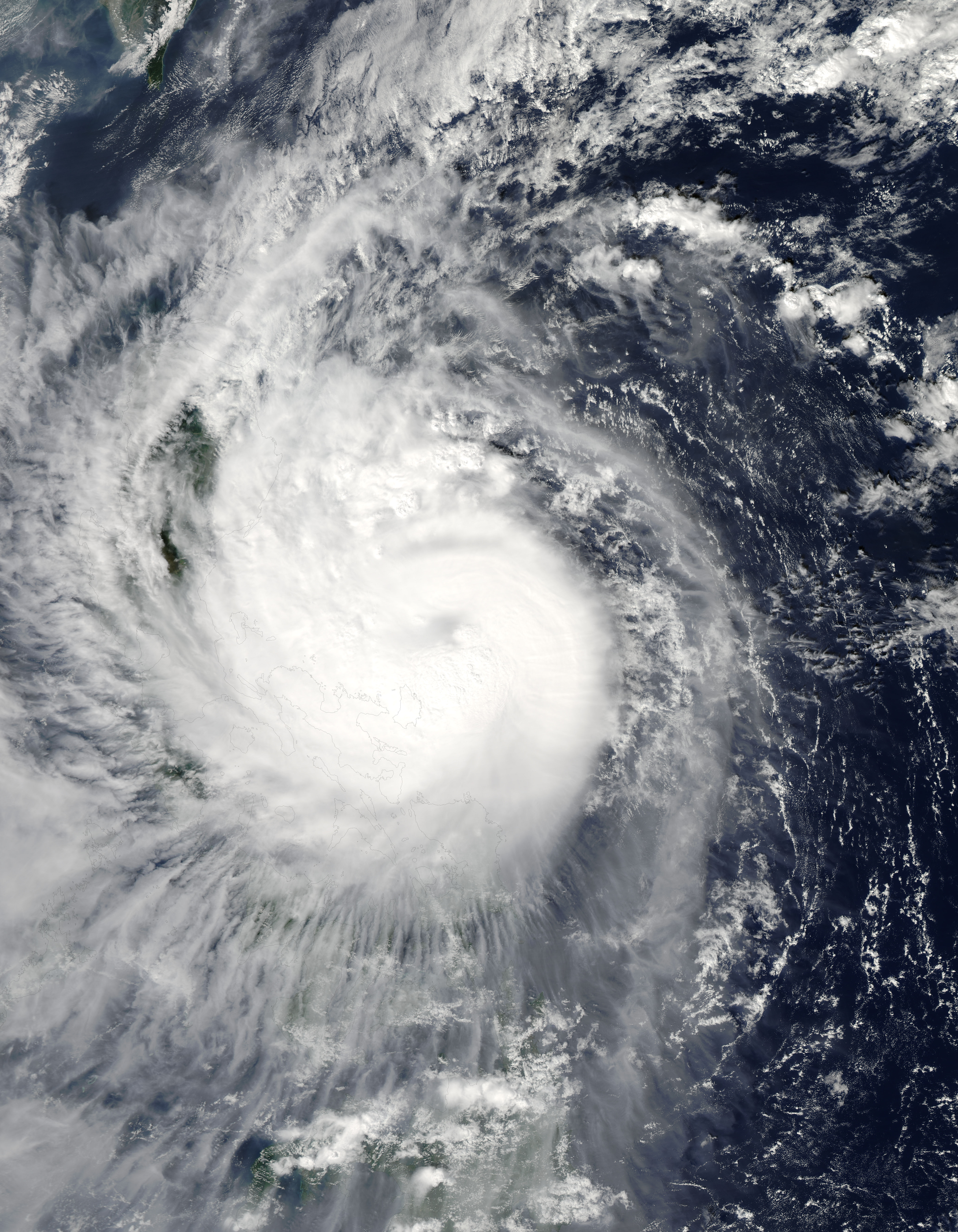
- Typhoon Mirinae near landfall in the Philippines on October 30

Meteorological history
- Formed: October 25, 2009
- Dissipated: November 2, 2009

Typhoon
- 10-minute sustained (JMA)
- Highest winds: 150 km/h (90 mph)
- Lowest pressure: 955 hPa (mbar); 28.20 inHg

Category 2-equivalent typhoon
- 1-minute sustained (SSHWS/JTWC)
- Highest winds: 165 km/h (105 mph)
- Lowest pressure: 956 hPa (mbar); 28.23 inHg

Overall effects
- Fatalities: 160
- Injuries: ~38
- Damage: $423 million (2009 USD)
- Areas affected: Mariana Islands, Philippines, Vietnam, Cambodia, Laos, Thailand
- IBTrACS
- Part of the 2009 Pacific typhoon season

Typhoon Mirinae, (Note: The name Mirinae (Korean: 미리내, [miɾinæ]) was contributed by South Korea and means Milky Way in the Jeju language.) known in the Philippines as Typhoon Santi, was the 34th depression and the 14th typhoon in the 2009 Pacific typhoon season. It came several weeks after Typhoons Ketsana and Parma devastated the Philippines, thus adding additional damage wrought by the two preceding typhoons.

== Meteorological history ==
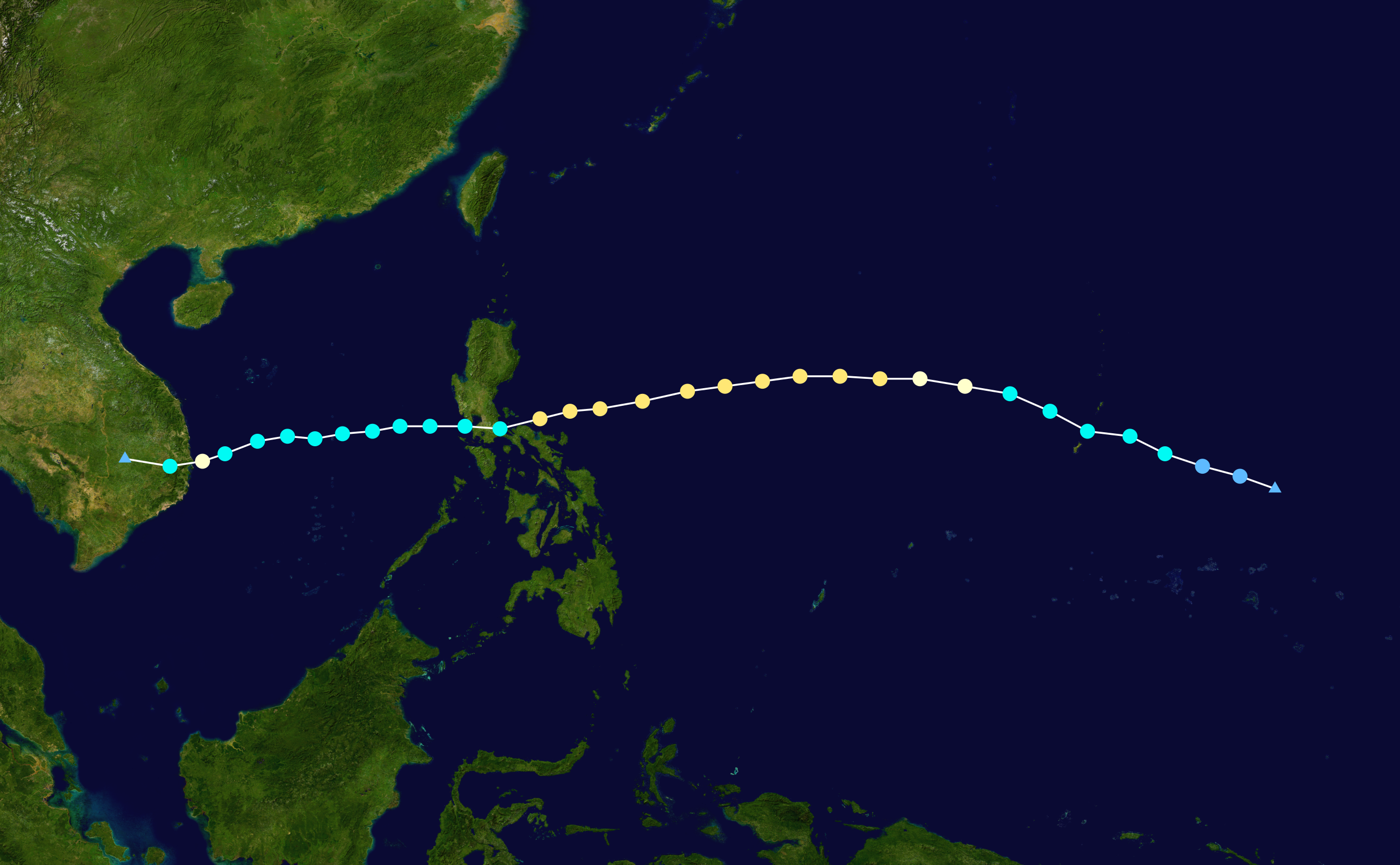
Map plotting the storm's track and intensity, according to the Saffir–Simpson scale Map key Saffir–Simpson scale Tropical depression (≤38 mph, ≤62 km/h) Tropical storm (39–73 mph, 63–118 km/h) Category 1 (74–95 mph, 119–153 km/h) Category 2 (96–110 mph, 154–177 km/h) Category 3 (111–129 mph, 178–208 km/h) Category 4 (130–156 mph, 209–251 km/h) Category 5 (≥157 mph, ≥252 km/h) Unknown Storm type Tropical cyclone Subtropical cyclone Extratropical cyclone, remnant low, tropical disturbance, or monsoon depression

Early on October 10, 2009, the Joint Typhoon Warning Center (JTWC) reported that an area of convection was developing over an elongated and broad low level circulation center within a monsoon trough about 500 km, 315 miles to the southeast of Pohnpei. The low level circulation center was located under a region of favourable divergence, however it was located in area of moderate to high vertical windshear which was hampering the low level circulation centers attempts to organize. Over the next couple of days the vertical windshear relaxed and as a result convection started to develop further with a Tropical Cyclone Formation Alert being issued by the JTWC late on October 25 after the Japan Meteorological Agency (JMA) had designated the disturbance as a weak tropical depression. The JTWC then designated the depression as 23W early the next morning as there had been an increase in convection consolidating near a developing low level circulation center. The JTWC then reported later that day that the depression had intensified into a Tropical Storm, however the JMA did not follow suit until early the next day when they assigned the international name of Mirinae to the storm as it passed over the island of Rota in the Northern Mariana Islands. As Mirinae entered the Philippine Area of Responsibility on October 28, the PAGASA assigned Mirinae the local name "Santi", the nineteenth named storm of the Philippines. Mirinae intensified steadily, eventually becoming a Category 2 typhoon, with peak winds of 105 mph (165 km/h). Due to increasing wind shear and its fast movement, Mirinae didn't intensify further. At this time Mirinae turned to the south-west, which it tracked for several days until its landfall along the province of Quezon at the night of October 30, with Mirinae as a Category 2 typhoon. As it left the Philippines, Mirinae has weakened to a tropical storm, with winds of 65 mph. It trekked the South China Sea, with Mirinae not intensifying beyond tropical storm force due to increasing wind shear and decreasing sea surface temperatures, as well as cooler and more stable air along the area. It ultimately made landfall on Vietnam on November 2, as a Category 1 typhoon. Mirinae quickly dissipated inland the same day.

== Preparations ==
=== Northern Mariana Islands ===
Early on October 26, the National Weather Service Weather Forecast Office in Tiyan, Guam placed Guam, Rota, Tinian and Saipan under a tropical storm watch which meant that tropical storm force winds were possible on the islands within 48 hours. They then upgraded the watch for Rota, Tinian and Saipan to a Tropical Storm Warning as tropical storm force winds were now expected on the islands within 24 hours. These warnings and watches were kept in force until they were cancelled early the next day after the tropical depression had moved away and intensified into a tropical storm.

=== Philippines ===
Signal no. 3 was raised all over the parts of Southern Luzon, including Metro Manila, early in the morning of Friday even though the storm was far away. Ships that will travel were canceled as early as Friday for the preparation for the typhoon. Flights in and outside the Philippines were also canceled due to the typhoon. Signal no. 2 was raised across the Central Luzon and Bicol Region and Signal no. 1 was raised over northern Visayas and southern provinces of Northern Luzon. It had brought extreme winds in its passage.

=== Highest Public Storm Warning Signal ===
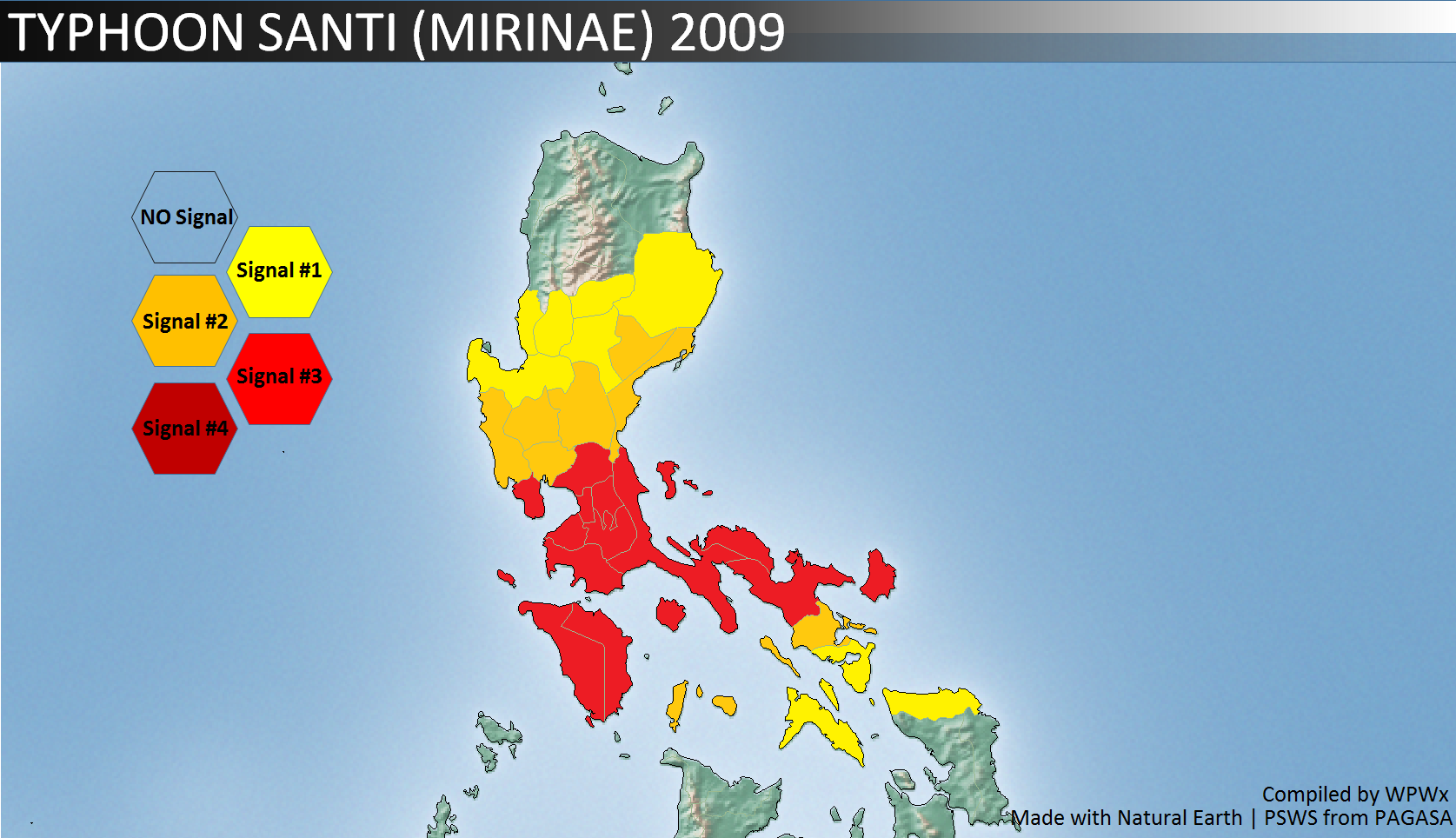

PSWS#	Luzon	Visayas	Mindanao
3	Metro Manila, Bataan, Bulacan, Rizal, Cavite, Batangas, Laguna, Quezon including Polillo Island, Camarines Provinces, Catanduanes, Marinduque, Mindoro Provinces, Lubang Island	None	None
2	Zambales, Tarlac, Pampanga, Nueva Ecija, Aurora, Quirino, Romblon, Albay	None	None
1	Pangasinan, La Union, Benguet, Nueva Vizcaya, Ifugao, Isabela, Sorsogon, Masbate	Northern Samar, Northern Panay	None

=== Vietnam ===
The tropical storm roared toward Vietnam on November 1 after battering the Philippine capital and surrounding provinces, leaving 20 people dead in a region still soggy from three recent storms. Typhoon Mirinae weakened November 1 as it headed over the South China Sea. Vietnamese Prime Minister, Nguyễn Tấn Dũng, ordered residents to begin evacuating high-risk areas of five coastal provinces and ordered Vietnamese fishermen in the South China Sea to seek shelter immediately. Along with the Philippines, Vietnam was still recovering from Typhoon Ketsana, which brought the Philippine capital, Manila, its worst flooding in 40 years and went on to kill more than 160 people in Vietnam in late September, 2009.

Mirinae made landfall in the coastal province of Phu Yen on November 2. More than 100 people were killed in the subsequent flooding.

== Impact ==
=== Philippines ===
Throughout the Philippines, Mirinae killed 39 people and left roughly $100.1 million in damage.

=== Vietnam ===
Torrential rainfall produced by Mirinae in Vietnam triggered catastrophic flooding, killing total 124 people. Roughly 2,400 homes were destroyed by swift currents and 437,300 hectares of crops were flooded. Damage was counted as 5.8 trillion đồng (US$323 million).

== See also ==
- Other tropical cyclones named Mirinae
- Other tropical cyclones named Santi
- Effects of the 2009 Pacific typhoon season in the Philippines
- Typhoon Nari (2013)
- Typhoon Hagupit (2014)
- Typhoon Damrey (2017)
