= Local storm report =

Report transmitted by the National Weather Service

A Local Storm Report (LSR) is transmitted by the National Weather Service (NWS) when it receives significant information from storm spotters, such as amateur radio operators, storm chasers, law enforcement officials, civil defense (now emergency management) personnel, firefighters, EMTs or public citizens, about severe weather conditions in their warning responsibility area (County Warning Area or CWA). Those reports are received by local National Weather Service offices (WFOs), and they can be used to issue Severe Thunderstorm Warnings, Tornado Warnings, and other weather warnings/bulletins, in addition to the LSR.

The Storm Prediction Center, working with the NWS WFOs, collects these reports for its own database, and it also works with the National Climatic Data Center, which eventually stores the reports in the official record, which is called Storm Data.

== Example ==
The following is an example of a stand-alone LSR that has one individual report from a SKYWARN spotter:

NWUS53 KGID 172339
LSRGID

PRELIMINARY LOCAL STORM REPORT
NATIONAL WEATHER SERVICE HASTINGS NE
639 PM CDT THU JUN 17 2010

..TIME...   ...EVENT...      ...CITY LOCATION...     ...LAT.LON...
..DATE...   ....MAG....      ..COUNTY LOCATION..ST.. ...SOURCE....
            ..REMARKS..

0636 PM     HAIL             2 SSW KIRWIN            39.64N 99.14W 
06/17/2010  E0.75 INCH       PHILLIPS           KS   TRAINED SPOTTER 

            DIME SIZE HAIL AT SCOUT RESERVATION 


&&

$$

Summary LSRs, which can have an extensive listing of individual reports, are also often issued by NWS WFOs after a weather event has ended in order to inform the public and news media outlets of the breadth of severe weather across a WFO's CWA.

== See also ==
- Severe weather terminology
