= Tropical Storm Hermine (2010) =

Atlantic and Pacific tropical storm in 2010

Tropical Storm Hermine Tropical Depression Eleven-E
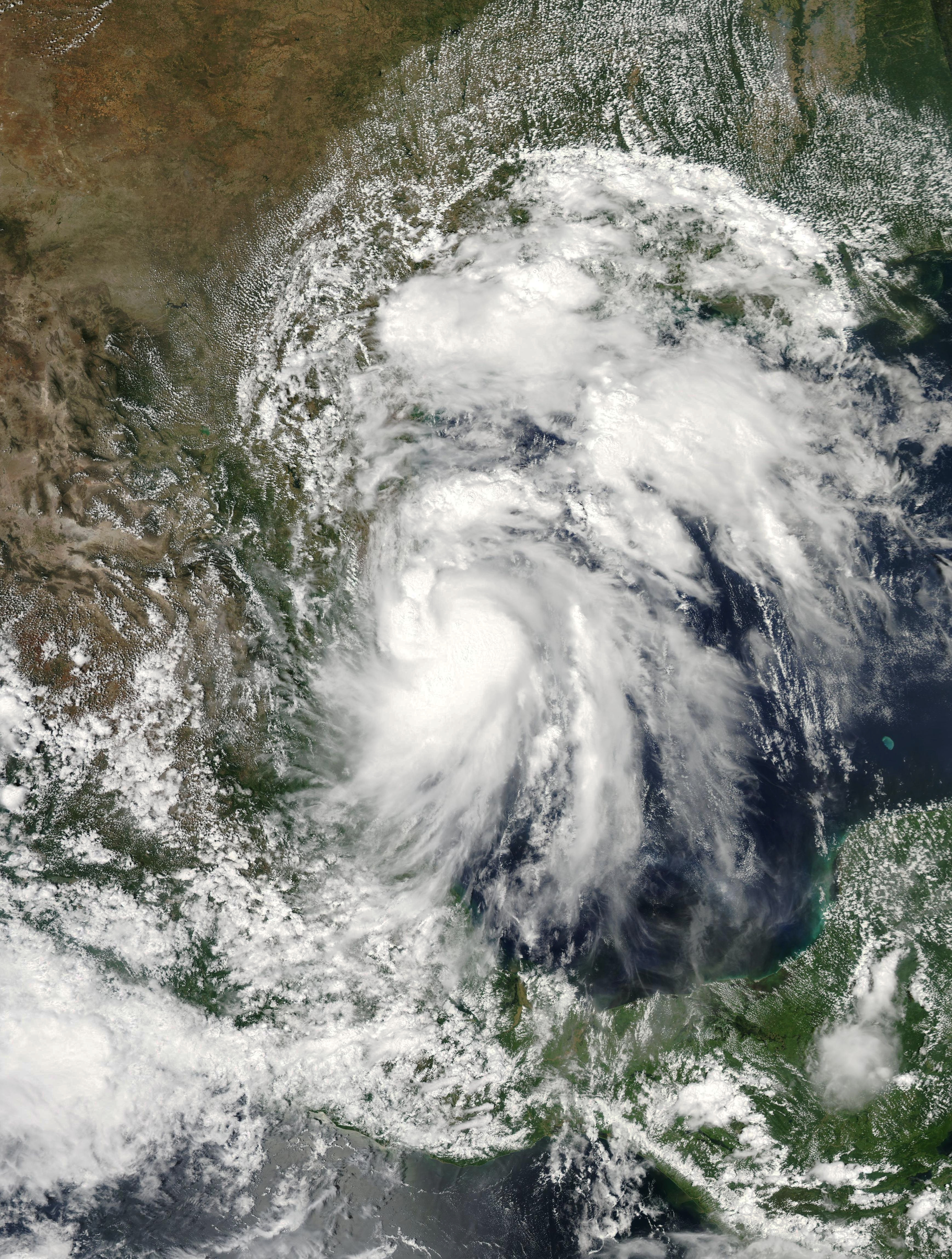
- Tropical Storm Hermine near landfall in northern Mexico on September 6

Meteorological history
- Formed: September 3, 2010
- Remnant low: September 9, 2010
- Dissipated: September 10, 2010

Tropical storm
- 1-minute sustained (SSHWS/NWS)
- Highest winds: 70 mph (110 km/h)
- Lowest pressure: 989 mbar (hPa); 29.21 inHg

Overall effects
- Fatalities: 52 direct, 50 indirect, 100 presumed dead
- Damage: $740 million (2010 USD)
- Areas affected: Central America; Mexico; Texas; Oklahoma; Kansas
- IBTrACS
- Part of the 2010 Atlantic and Pacific hurricane seasons

Tropical Storm Hermine was a near-hurricane strength tropical cyclone that brought widespread flooding from Guatemala northwards to Oklahoma in early September 2010. Though it was named in the western Gulf of Mexico, Hermine developed directly from the remnant low-pressure area associated with the short-lived Tropical Depression Eleven-E in the Eastern Pacific, and is the most recent tropical cyclone to cross over into the North Atlantic basin from the Eastern Pacific. Throughout its lifespan, the storm caused 52 direct deaths and roughly US$740 million in damage to crops and infrastructure, primarily in Guatemala. The precursor tropical depression formed on September 3 in the Gulf of Tehuantepec and neared tropical storm intensity before making landfall near Salina Cruz, Mexico, on the next day. Though the depression quickly weakened to a remnant low, the disturbance crossed the Isthmus of Tehuantepec and tracked north into the warm waters of the Gulf of Mexico, where it reorganized into a tropical cyclone once again on September 5. There, the system quickly strengthened into a tropical storm and received the name Hermine before moving ashore near Matamoros, Mexico on September 7 as a high-end tropical storm. Over the next few days, Hermine weakened as it moved over the U.S. Southern Plains, eventually dissipating over Kansas on September 10.

In the Eastern Pacific, Tropical Depression Eleven-E, along with moisture from a monsoonal flow, brought torrential rains to southern Mexico and Guatemala. At least 84 people were killed in the two countries and damage exceeded $500 million. In northern Mexico, the effects of Tropical Storm Hermine were limited. Further north, severe flooding affected large parts of Texas and Oklahoma, killing eight people and leaving at least $240 million in losses. Despite the deaths and damage, the name Hermine was not retired.

== Meteorological history ==
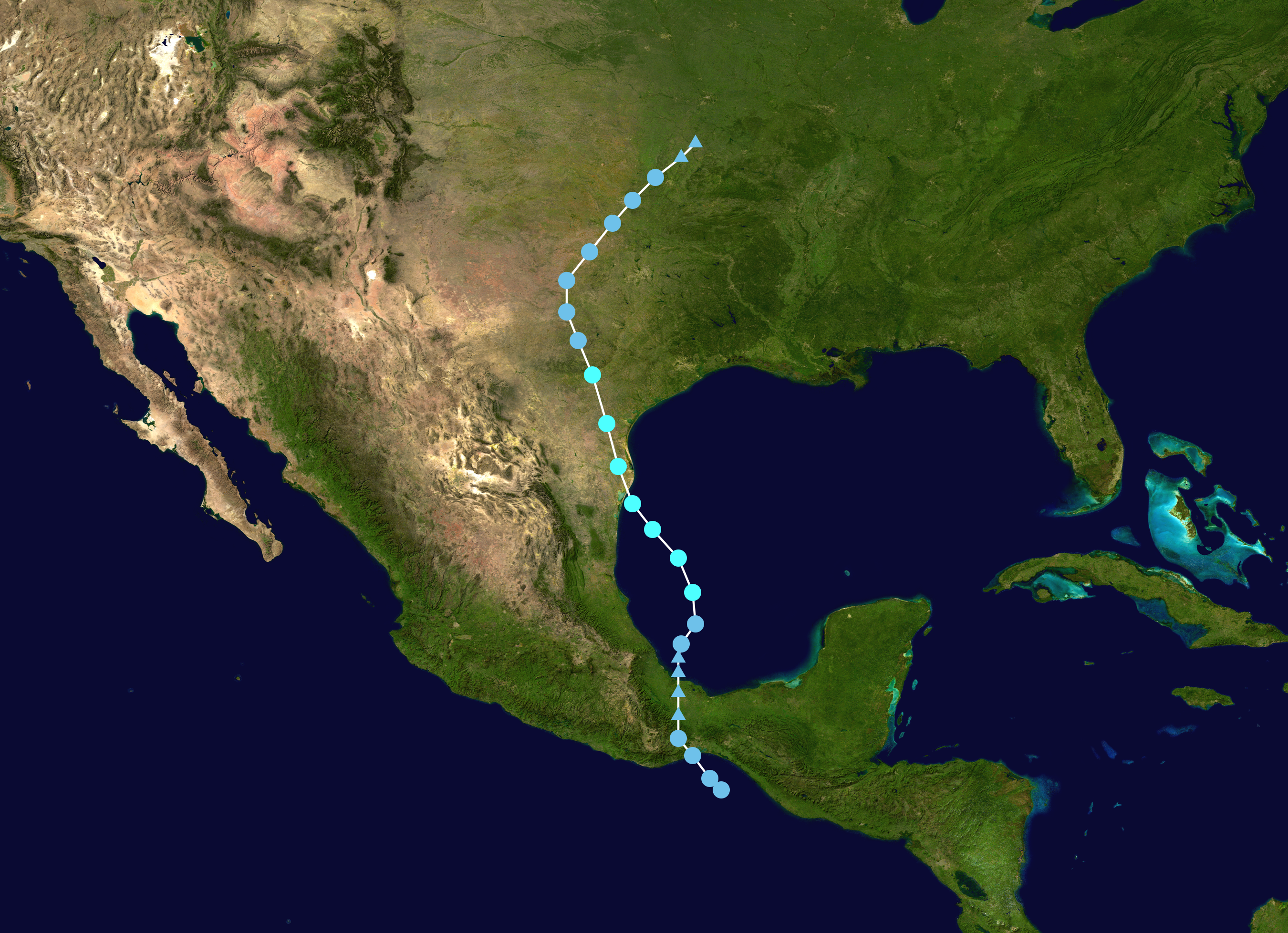
Map plotting the tracks and intensities of Eleven-E and Hermine according to the Saffir–Simpson hurricane wind scale Map key Saffir–Simpson scale Tropical depression (≤38 mph, ≤62 km/h) Tropical storm (39–73 mph, 63–118 km/h) Category 1 (74–95 mph, 119–153 km/h) Category 2 (96–110 mph, 154–177 km/h) Category 3 (111–129 mph, 178–208 km/h) Category 4 (130–156 mph, 209–251 km/h) Category 5 (≥157 mph, ≥252 km/h) Unknown Storm type Tropical cyclone Subtropical cyclone Extratropical cyclone, remnant low, tropical disturbance, or monsoon depression

In August 2010, a tropical wave in the eastern Atlantic contributed to the formation of Hurricane Danielle; Danielle eventually tracked west and then northward before dissipating south of Newfoundland after ten days. However, the southern portion of the disturbance became disassociated with Danielle's development and tracked west into Northern South America, reaching the East Pacific on August 29. Thunderstorm activity was confined over Central America until September 2, when showers developed over and around the Gulf of Tehuantepec. The National Hurricane Center (NHC) first assessed a low probability of tropical cyclogenesis at 00:00 UTC the following day.

Throughout September 3, the disturbance quickly developed in the gulf before a wind circulation at the surface beneath the system was detected; thus, the NHC designated the developing system as a tropical depression at 18:00 UTC that day when the storm was 115 mi (185 km) southeast of Salina Cruz, Mexico. Following formation, Eleven-E moved slowly towards the northwest and developed a well-pronounced inner rainband late on September 3. At 06:00 UTC the next day, the depression peaked with winds of 35 mph (55 km/h) before making landfall an hour later east of Salina Cruz. The cyclone's organized appearance on radar, which included a developing primordial eye, suggested that the depression was near tropical storm intensity at the time of landfall. A ship documented tropical storm-force winds during this period, but as they were well removed from the storm, it is believed that these stronger winds were associated with a nearby monsoonal wind flow. After moving inland, the depression quickly deteriorated and became a remnant low-pressure area by 18:00 UTC on September 4 over the Isthmus of Tehuantepec.

Though the mountainous terrain of Oaxaca and Chiapas greatly disrupted Tropical Depression Eleven-E's organization and led to its demise, the former cyclone's mid- and lower-level circulations remained intact as they moved into the Bay of Campeche. New and intense convection arose as soon as the vortex moved back over open water on September 4, hours after Eleven-E's declassification. Over the next day, the area of thunderstorms, initially disorganized, coalesced into a tropical depression once again in the southern Bay of Campeche at 18:00 UTC on September 5. Twelve hours after formation, the NHC upgraded the system to tropical storm status following conclusive reports from a nearby buoy. As a result, the tropical cyclone was named Hermine. Steady intensification continued as Hermine gravitated towards the Texas-Mexico border. Thunderstorm activity increased during the morning of September 6 as they continued to wrap around the center of the storm. Later that day, an eye was detected using radar imagery based in Brownsville, Texas, though the storms surrounding it remained rather meager.

At 02:00 UTC on September 7, Hermine made landfall near Matamoros, Mexico with maximum sustained winds of 70 mph (110 km/h) and a minimum barometric pressure of 989 mbar (hPa; 29.21 inHg); this was the cyclone's peak intensity. After moving ashore, Hermine slowly weakened and moved northward into Texas. At 00:00 UTC on September 8, the weakening tropical cyclone degenerated to tropical depression strength near Mason, Texas. However, Hermine's gusts remained much stronger than its sustained winds. Shortly after the downgrade, the NHC transferred its cyclone monitoring responsibilities to the Hydrometeorological Prediction Center (HPC). By that time, the weakening storm had lost most of its tropical cyclone characteristics, with a long line of thunderstorms extending southwards and paralleling Interstate 35. Hermine was determined to have weakened to a remnant low-pressure area over Oklahoma at 18:00 UTC on September 9, before dissipating over Kansas on the next day.

== Preparations ==
Prior to Hermine's landfall, officials in Mexico issued evacuations orders for parts of northern Tamaulipas. An estimated 3,500 people heeded these warnings. In Texas, the State Operations Center held a conference in relation to Tropical Storm Hermine to discuss emergency plans. Six flood rescue teams were placed on standby; Mass Care and American Red Cross were prepared to set up shelters; ten Texas Military high-profile vehicles along with UH60 and CH47 helicopters were on standby for potential flood relief efforts. By the afternoon of September 6, much of southern Texas was under a flash flood watch due to the threat of torrential downpours. Tornado watches extended from the coastline to northern Texas along the right side of the storm. As Hermine produced heavy rains from Texas to Missouri, the National Weather Service issued flash flood warnings for many areas. At one point, the entire state of Oklahoma was placed under a flash flood watch and most of the southeastern counties were under warnings.

== Impact ==
=== Central America ===
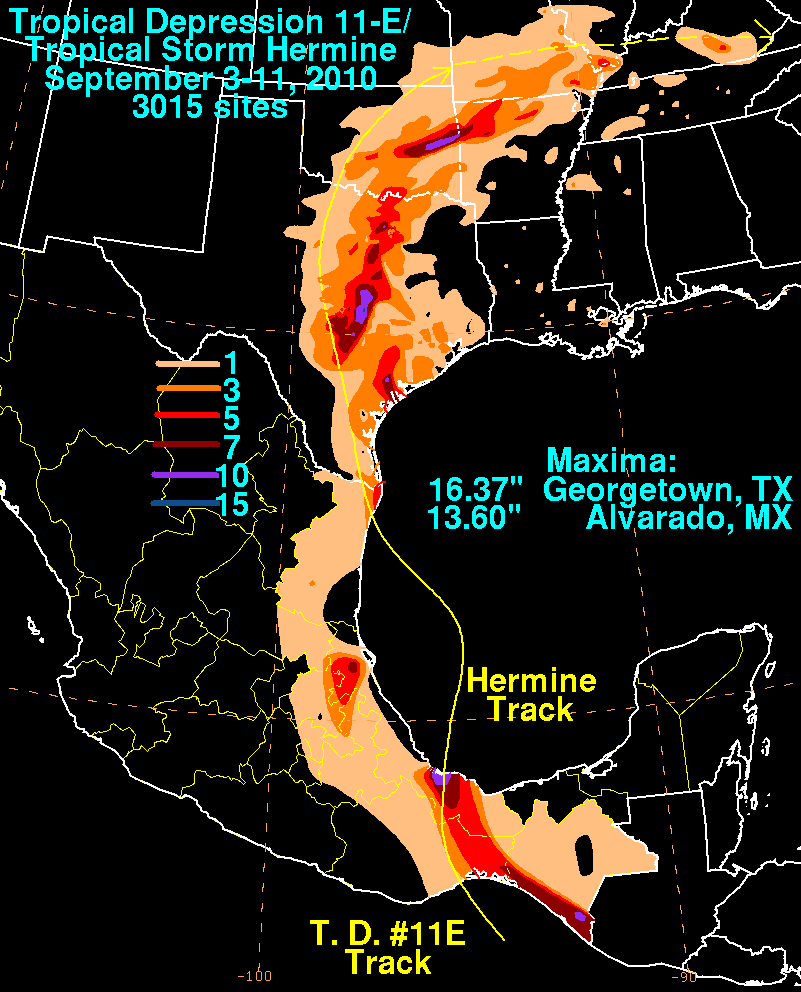
Rainfall from Tropical Depression Eleven-E and Tropical Storm Hermine in Mexico and the United States

Across Guatemala, heavy rains associated with a monsoonal flow and Tropical Depression Eleven-E triggered numerous landslides across the country. Along the Inter-American Highway, 41 people were killed after consecutive landslides buried a bus and rescue workers trying to pull survivors out of the trapped vehicle. The initial landslide killed 12 people in the bus. Hundreds of rescuers came to the site to try to save as many people as possible; however, a second landslide struck the same spot, burying hundreds of people. According to press reports, at least 41 people died along the highway and more than 100 others are believed to be dead. Throughout the country, officials stated that 30 landslides took place. One of these killed four more people after destroying their home in Quetzaltenango. Throughout the country, damage was estimated at $500 million.

Heavy rains in Costa Rica associated with the system triggered a landslide that killed three people and displaced hundreds.

=== Mexico ===
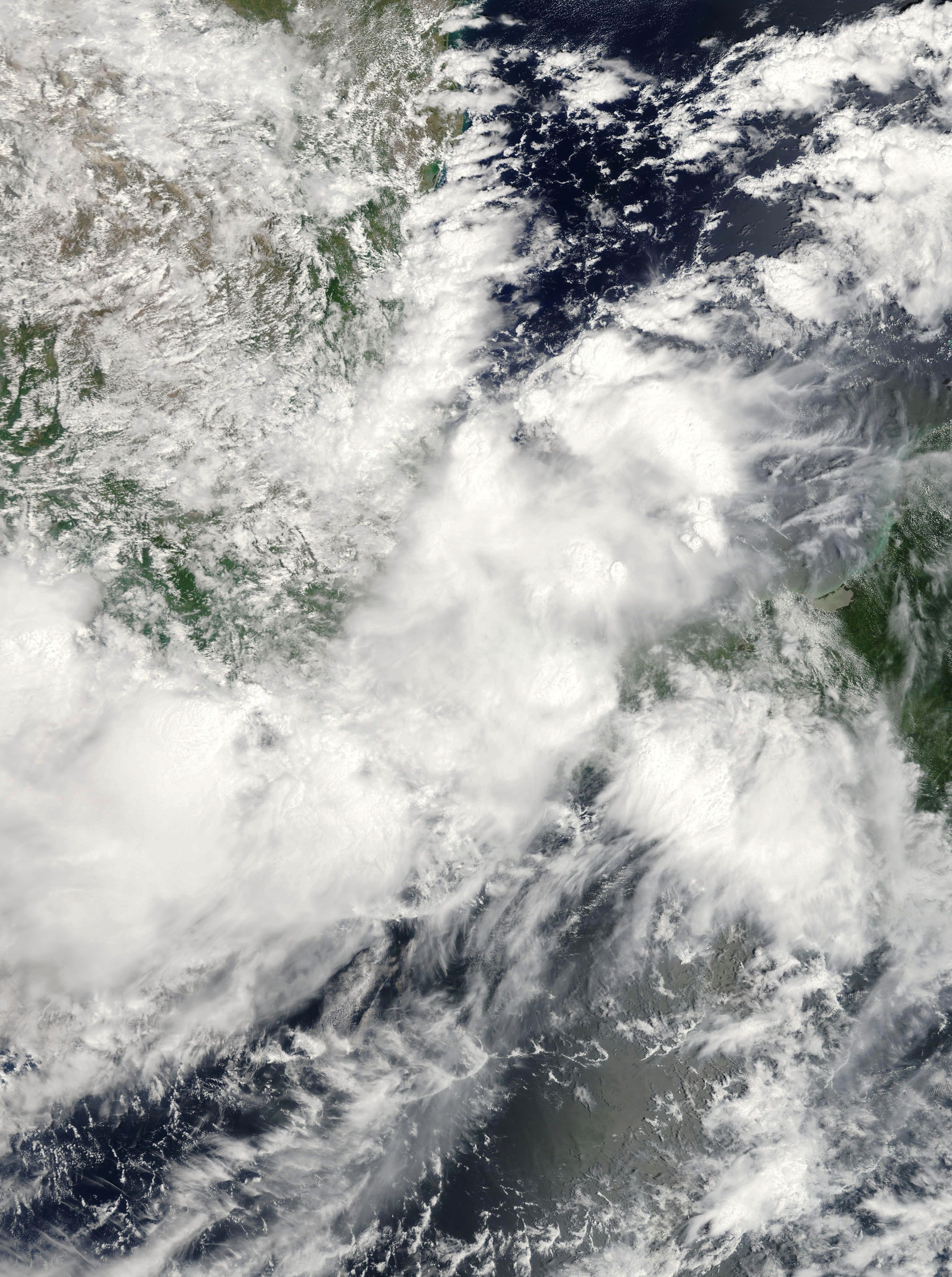
Tropical Depression Eleven-E over Central Mexico on September 4

Heavy impact was reported in southern Mexico, and several rivers overflowed their banks in the coast Oaxaca and thus a red (high) alert was issued. A total of 50,000 people were affected from the depression in Mexico. At least 46 people are known to have been killed throughout Oaxaca.

The system produced locally heavy rains in Veracruz, with a peak measurement of 13.6 in (350 mm) in Alvarado. In northern Mexico, rainfall over 3 in (76 mm) was confined to coastal areas. Throughout northern Tamaulipas tropical-storm-force winds downed trees, power lines and damaged several structures. Sustained winds of 53 mph (85 km/h) and gusts of 67 mph (108 km/h) were recorded in Matamoros. At least 20 homes were damaged throughout the city; no loss of life or injuries took place.

=== United States ===
Throughout Hermine's track in the United States, the storm produced heavy rainfall, especially along the east side of the system. After weakening to a depression, Hermine produced torrential downpours over the Texas hill country, peaking at 16.37 in (416 mm) in Georgetown. Additional heavy rains fell in Oklahoma, Arkansas and as far east as Kentucky. In these states, rainfall peak at 13.42 in (341 mm), 9.81 in (249 mm) and 6.7 in (170 mm) respectively. Scattered areas of moderate to heavy rain also felled in Louisiana, Missouri, Illinois and Mississippi.

In all, the storm resulted in eight fatalities, seven in Texas and one in Oklahoma, as well as an estimated $240 million in damage.

==== Texas ====
Radar loop of Tropical Storm Hermine moving through southern Texas on September 7

In Texas, strong winds were recorded in Harlingen where sustained winds reached 59 mph (95 km/h) and gusted to 73 mph (117 km/h). Elsewhere in Texas, large portions of the state east of where Hermine's center tracked recorded gale-force-winds. Along the coast, the system also brought a storm surge, peaking at 3.4 ft (1.0 m) in Port Aransas. Damage over the lower Rio Grande Valley was generally minor. Some trees and power lines were knocked down as a result of the high winds, resulting in power outages over the area. About 30,000 customers lost power at one time or another during the storm in the region. The hardest hit were in Cameron and Willacy Counties. In central Texas, an estimated 100,000 residences were left without power, mainly in Bexar County, due to downed trees. According to surveys of the region, roughly 300 trees were downed by the storm. In Georgetown, where the heaviest rain fell, RV parks and nearby I-35 were flooded, prompting a few evacuations.

Throughout the state, hundreds high water rescues had to be made by rescue teams. Some areas recorded flood waters up to 5 ft (1.5 m) deep. In Johnson County, more than 60 water rescues were made after flash flooding inundated numerous homes. According to fire Chief Richard Van Winkle of the Alvarado fire department, "This is about as bad as I've seen it". In the town, one person was killed after he drove his car into a flooded street and was swept away. In Arlington, 90 people had to be evacuated from an apartment building after a nearby creek flooded, leaving some of the rooms under 8 ft (2.4 m) of water. Over 50 homes were severely damaged and eventually purchased a year later by the city. The creek also swept through a nearby neighborhood with enough force to uproot trees in its path. In Bell County, severe flooding resulted in one fatality after a 19-year-old girl drowned when her car was swept off a flooded road.

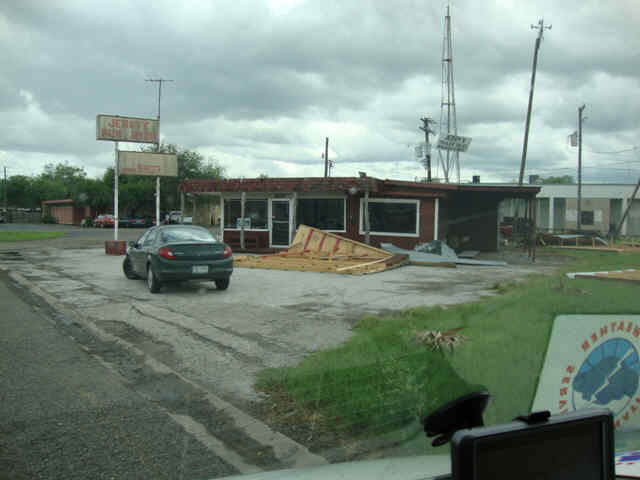
Wind damage from Tropical Storm Hermine in Kingsville, Texas

Several tornadoes were spawned throughout Texas as a result of Hermine. A brief EF0 tornado, which resulted in little damage, was confirmed near Moulton, Texas. The strongest tornado struck Dallas just west of North Westmoreland Road near La Reunion Parkway, damaging several structures. This tornado was later rated EF2 with estimated winds of 115 mph (185 km/h). This was the strongest tornado to strike Dallas since an F4 in 1974. Throughout northern Texas, six tornadoes were confirmed and several more likely touched down elsewhere in the state.

According to the Red Cross, a total of 843 homes were affected by the storm throughout Texas; 68 were destroyed, 231 sustained major damage and 283 received minor damage. Another flood-related fatality took place in Johnson County. In Jamaica Beach, Texas, one woman drowned in a rip current related to the oncoming Hermine and others needed to be rescued.

==== Oklahoma ====
After moving through Texas, the remnants of Hermine produced widespread rainfall, locally heavy, in Oklahoma which triggered significant flooding. One person was killed in the state as result of Hermine's passage. Nearly all of Sequoyah County was left underwater, resulting in severe infrastructural damage. Nearly 30 mi (48 km) were washed away by the floods. Preliminary estimates placed damage in the county were $2.5 million. Scattered power outages took place in the state, mainly attributed to tornadoes, with the Oklahoma Gas and Electric Company reporting roughly 5,000 outages. The National Weather Service confirmed three tornadoes in relation to Hermine, including an EF0 tornado that struck Lone Grove, a town devastated by an EF4 tornado in February 2009. In Colbert, an EF1 tornado destroyed one home and injured a truck driver after knocking his vehicle on its side. During the morning of September 9, a second round of rain fell across eastern portions of the state, resulting in additional flooding. Along US 69, a portion of the roadway was covered with several feet of water. Other state highways were flooded as well; however, most of the water receded that afternoon.

== Aftermath ==
=== Guatemala ===
In response to the substantial loss of life along Inter-American Highway, Guatemalan President Álvaro Colom declared a state of emergency for the country. On September 6, President Colom declared a national day of mourning for victims of the storm.

=== United States ===
As reports of widespread flooding came out of Texas, evacuation orders were issued for some of the hardest hit areas and seven shelters were opened in four counties. The Salvation Army set up mobile feeding units along the Interstate 35 corridor to support flood response operations. In the wake of the severe flooding caused by Tropical Storm Hermine, Texas governor Rick Perry declared 40 affected counties as disaster areas and requested that 13 of these be federal disaster areas. Just two days after the storm's passage, insurance claims had reached $75 million and were expected to exceed $100 million. In early October, the Federal Emergency Management Agency (FEMA) denied governor Perry's requests for the 13 counties, stating that damage was not substantial enough to warrant federal aid. However, it was argued that since most of the hardest hit communities were rural areas with limited resources, they would need assistance recovering. On October 12, governor Rick Perry filed a formal appeal to President Barack Obama to reconsider the denial of public assistance. Following further damage assessments, governor Perry also stated that at least $13 million was needed to repair losses. Following this appeal, FEMA again denied federal assistance. On November 10, The U.S. Small Business Administration passed a disaster declaration for 18 counties in Texas, allowing residents to apply for low-interest loans.

On September 10, Oklahoma governor Brad Henry declared a state of emergency for 13 counties and later requested federal assistance for Sequoyah County. However, the request for federal aid was later denied by FEMA.

== See also ==
- Tropical cyclones in 2010
- Other storms of the same name
- List of Atlantic–Pacific crossover hurricanes
- 1960 Texas tropical storm
- Tropical storms Amanda and Cristobal
