= February 2009 North American storm complex =

2009 storm complex in the United States

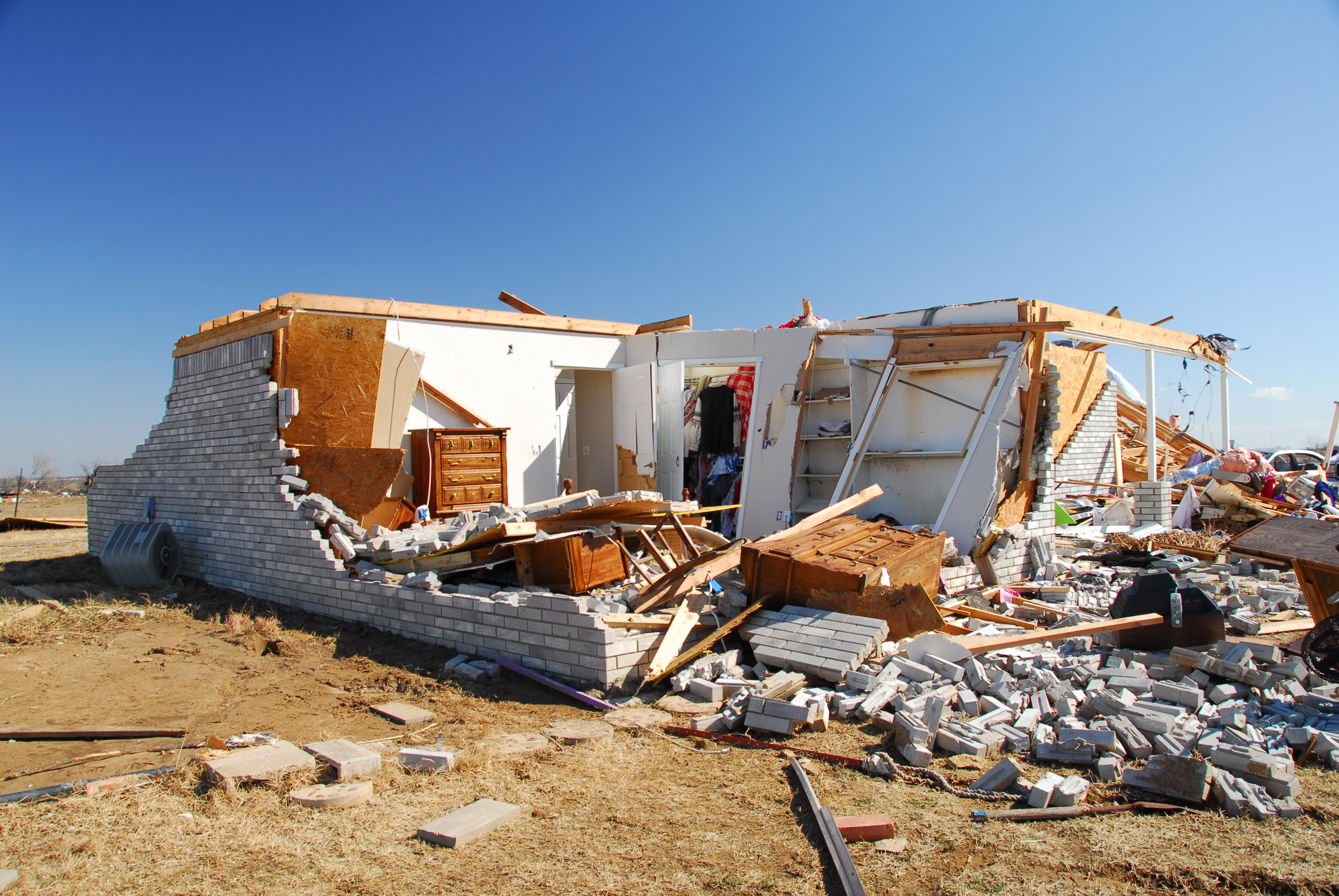
- Damage in Lone Grove, Oklahoma, caused by an EF4 tornado on February 10

Meteorological history
- Date: February 10–11, 2009

Tornado outbreak
- Tornadoes: 14
- Max. rating: EF4 tornado
- Duration: 26 hours and 26 minutes
- Highest winds: Tornadic: 170 mph (270 km/h) (EF4 Lone Grove, OK); Non-tornadic: 92 mph (148 km/h) (Allegheny County Airport, PA)

Winter storm
- Lowest pressure: 986 mb (hPa)
- Max. snowfall: 6 inches (15 cm)

Overall effects
- Casualties: 15 fatalities (8 tornadic, 7 non-tornadic)
- Damage: $1.7 billion (2009 USD)
- Areas affected: Central and Eastern United States
- Power outages: >2,272,000
- Part of the 2008–09 North American winter and tornado outbreaks of 2009

On February 10–11, 2009, a broad-scale damaging wind event and small tornado outbreak affected the Central and Eastern United States. During the two-day period, 14 tornadoes touched down in seven states. Oklahoma was struck by six tornadoes, the most of any state. The six tornadoes in Oklahoma also tied the record for the most tornadoes ever recorded in the state during the month of February, which would later be broken in 2023. The first day of the outbreak produced the most tornadoes; the second brought mainly high wind damage and rain or snow in most of the Northeast.

The storm system responsible for the tornado outbreak resulted from the unusual congruence of a cold, dry system, originating in the Four Corners and a warm, moist system, moving north out of Texas. Complicating factors included daytime heating and a strong wind field favorable to the creation of circulating thunderstorms. On the second day, the stronger cold front limited discrete supercell activity and the risk of tornadoes decreased significantly. A squall line, however, produced high winds and rain along the river valleys, primarily those of the Mississippi and Ohio Rivers. A tight pressure-gradient behind the cold front led to a large area of damaging non-thunderstorm winds across the Midwest and Ohio Valley. This squall line continued to renew its energy as it passed through the Midwest, Pennsylvania, New Jersey, New York, and New England, causing wind and water damage, and dumping 6 inches (15 cm) of snow in central and eastern Massachusetts. The resulting power outages affected homes throughout the northeastern seaboard.

The widespread damaging winds left an estimated $1.7 billion (2009 USD) in damage across the Ohio River Valley and Southeastern United States. A small tornado outbreak accompanied the storm, with 14 confirmed across 7 states. The most significant damage occurred in Oklahoma from two tornadoes in the Oklahoma City metropolitan area and a deadly EF4 tornado that destroyed large parts of Lone Grove. The EF4 tornado killed eight people and injured 46 others.

== Meteorological synopsis ==
=== February 10 ===
Early on February 10, 2009, a strong upper-level trough moved east from the Four Corners into the central and southern Great Plains by the afternoon and early evening hours. Temperatures across Texas and Oklahoma were unusually low antecedent to a severe weather outbreak, generally ranging from 30 to 50 °F (−1 to 10 °C). Early morning fog moving northwest into Oklahoma signaled the arrival of low-level moisture into the region. Strong surface heating combined with cooler air aloft created an unstable atmosphere, a situation unusual in the region for February. In the afternoon hours, a shortwave trough moved from Arizona into Texas while a strong mid-level jet emanated from the Big Bend region. Daytime heating of the moistening boundary layer increased throughout the afternoon across Oklahoma and Texas as cloud cover shifted eastward. A very strong wind field increased with height through the lower troposphere, resulting in a wind shear favorable for rotation in the thunderstorms.

Meteorologists expected large hail stones and damaging winds, and recognized the potential for strong tornadoes as thunderstorms developed from central Oklahoma southward into north-central Texas in the afternoon. During the night, a cold front moved eastward toward the Mississippi Valley and organized the thunderstorms into a lengthy squall line. Along with a continued threat of hail and tornadoes, the risk of damaging winds increased. The Storm Prediction Center announced a "moderate risk" of severe weather for portions of eastern Oklahoma, northeastern Texas, western Arkansas, and northwestern Louisiana.

Around 19:00 UTC, a line of thunderstorms began developing near the Wichita Mountains in Comanche County, Oklahoma. One supercell originating there produced five tornadoes from Canadian County in the Oklahoma City metropolitan area to Pawnee County. One of these was rated EF2 when it struck western areas of Edmond. The most significant tornado originated in Montague County, Texas at 00:48 UTC. It quickly crossed the Red River into Oklahoma and moved through predominantly rural areas, ultimately striking Lone Grove at EF4 intensity. Severe damage took place in the town and eight people were killed. In addition to the five Oklahoma tornadoes, three tornadoes struck northern sections of Texas and one tornado hit Springfield, Missouri.

Storm Prediction Center's graphical outlooks for February 10–11, 2009
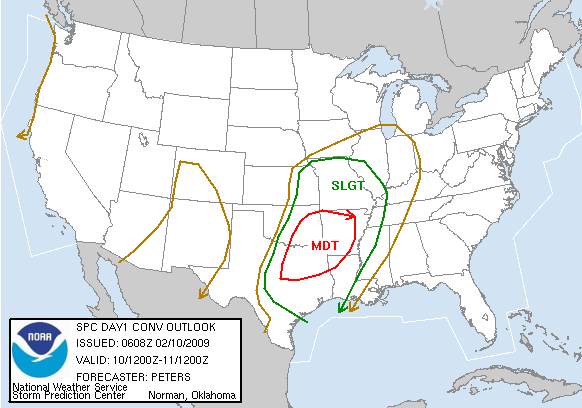
February 10 convective outlook graphic issued at 06:00 UTC

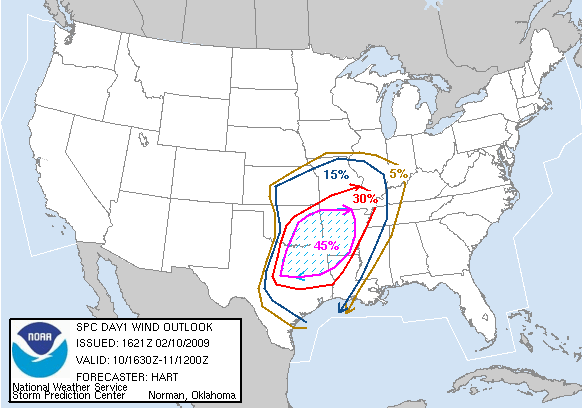
February 10 probabilistic damaging wind graphic issued at 16:00 UTC

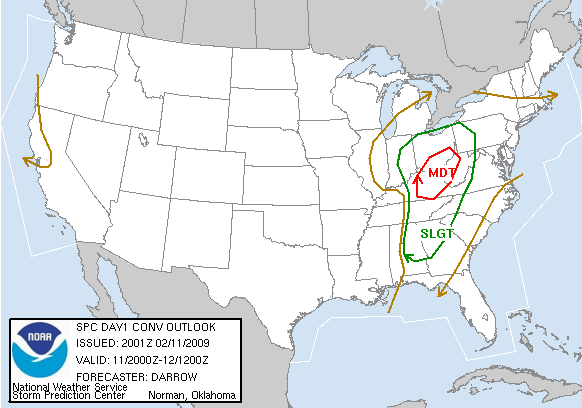
February 11 convective outlook graphic issued at 20:00 UTC

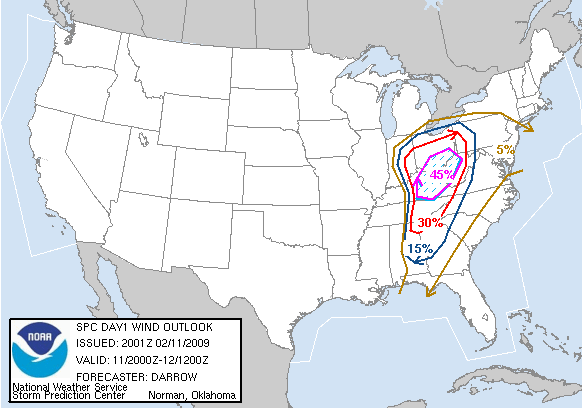
February 11 probabilistic damaging wind graphic issued at 20:00 UTC

=== February 11 ===
Concurrent with the strong upper-level trough tracking northeastward, the threat for organized severe weather shifted eastward into the Ohio River Valley on February 11, where the Storm Prediction Center issued a Slight risk across much of the region. Very strong wind fields, including mid-level winds upwards of 115 kn (130 mph; 215 km/h), overspread the risk area. Strong forcing along an eastward-moving cold front combined with those wind fields led to the persistence of a low-topped squall line despite little instability ahead of the convection. Widespread sunshine developed ahead of the squall line throughout the afternoon hours, increasing the potential for strong winds aloft to be transferred to the surface. As such, the Storm Prediction Center raised the threat level to a Moderate risk across portions of Kentucky, Ohio, and West Virginia for widespread and potentially significant damaging winds. The organization would ultimately receive over 350 reports of damaging winds on February 11, including a peak gust of 85 kn (100 mph; 155 km/h) near Belle, West Virginia. By the evening hours, the squall line encountered cooler surface temperatures and became increasingly separated from the powerful upper-level trough, and it lost its vigor moving through the Mid-Atlantic region.

== Confirmed tornadoes ==
Daily statistics of tornadoes during the outbreak of February 10–11, 2009 (Note: All dates are based on the local time zone where the tornado touched down; however, all times are in Coordinated Universal Time for consistency.)
Date	Total	Enhanced Fujita scale rating						Deaths	Injuries	Damage
Date	Total	EF0	EF1	EF2	EF3	EF4	EF5	Deaths	Injuries	Damage
February 10	10	2	6	1	0	1	0	8	50	$14,750,000
February 11	4	1	3	0	0	0	0	0	0	$243,000
Total	14	3	9	1	0	1	0	8	50	$14,993,000

=== February 10–11 event ===
Confirmed tornadoes during the tornado outbreak of February 10–11, 2009
EF#	Location	County / Parish	State	Coord.	Date	Time (UTC)	Path length	Max width	Summary
EF1	NNW of Wiley Post Airport	Oklahoma	OK	35.5553°N 97.6397°W	February 10	20:36–20:37	0.7 mi (1.1 km)	75 yd (69 m)	This was the first of five tornadoes produced by a supercell in northwestern areas of the Oklahoma City metropolitan area. This brief tornado touched down in a large shopping center along SH-3 and caused extensive roof damage to several structures. It then moved into a residential neighborhood where several buildings in an apartment complex saw primarily minor damage; one apartment had its roof torn off.
EF2	Western Edmond	Oklahoma, Logan	OK	35.6631°N 97.5309°W	February 10	20:53–21:05	5.7 mi (9.2 km)	250 yd (230 m)	The second tornado touched down on the west side of Edmond and traveled northeast into Logan County. Extensive damage occurred in residential areas, with the most severe damage occurring in the Oak Tree development along the Oklahoma–Logan county line. There, several homes had large portions of their roof torn off and garages destroyed. An auto body repair shop and mobile home were totally destroyed. Throughout Edmond, six homes were destroyed, eight structures received major damage, 51 received minor damage and another 166 structures were affected. Approximately 28,500 people lost power, primarily in the Edmond area. Hundreds of trees were uprooted or significantly damaged along the tornado's path. In Oklahoma County, the tornado left an estimated 28,500 people without power. Four people suffered minor injuries. The combined damage of the two Oklahoma County tornadoes was estimated at $10.2 million.
EF1	NW of Meridian	Logan	OK	35.861°N 97.2846°W	February 10	21:24–21:26	1 mi (1.6 km)	10 yd (9.1 m)	A brief tornado tore the roof off one home and damaged the roof of another. Minor tree damage occurred.
EF1	ENE of Langston to SW of Stillwater	Payne	OK	35.953°N 97.183°W	February 10	21:39–21:59	10 mi (16 km)	50 yd (46 m)	This tornado destroyed a barn and an oilfield communications tower and snapped trees. Numerous power lines and transmission poles were brought down near an Oklahoma Gas & Electric substation, leaving 1,586 customers without power in Payne County. Most of the outages were around SH-33.
EF0	SSW of Pawnee	Pawnee	OK	36.2899°N 96.8206°W	February 10	22:35–22:37	2.6 mi (4.2 km)	400 yd (370 m)	Two barns were completely destroyed and several homes were damaged. Power poles were also damaged but service was restored within a day. Four cows presumed to have been "blown away" from a pasture. This was the last of five tornadoes produced by the Oklahoma metro supercell.
EF0	Southern Belcherville	Montague	TX	33.79°N 97.83°W	February 10	00:25–00:28	0.39 mi (0.63 km)	35 yd (32 m)	A brief tornado destroyed several outbuildings and two sheds and damaged the roof of one home. Two trees were uprooted and a water tank was flipped. The storm that produced this tornado later spawned the EF4 Lone Grove tornado.
EF4	S of Spanish Fort, TX to Lone Grove, OK to SSE of Springer, OK	Montague (TX), Jefferson (OK), Love (OK), Carter (OK)	TX, OK	33.93°N 97.62°W	February 10	00:45–01:43	37 mi (60 km)	880 yd (800 m)	8 deaths – See article on this tornado – 46 people were injured.
EF1	Colleyville	Tarrant	TX	32.9106°N 97.1416°W	February 10	03:15–03:17	0.47 mi (0.76 km)	100 yd (91 m)	This brief tornado touched down in the northwestern suburbs of the Dallas–Fort Worth metroplex. Damage was confined to the Caldwell Creek neighborhood where 5 homes had extensive roof or structural damage and 15 others suffered minor damage. Monetary losses were estimated at $750,000. The American Red Cross provided supplies and snacks to residents.
EF1	Southwestern Springfield	Greene	MO	37.1332°N 93.3371°W	February 10	04:43–04:49	5.42 mi (8.72 km)	75 yd (69 m)	This tornado moved along an intermittent path across southwestern and central Springfield, damaging one to two dozen houses and businesses, and toppling several trees and power lines. At least 250 residences were left without power, and damage was estimated at $350,000. The tornado occurred without being detected on radar until it had already touched down.
EF1	NNE of Garden Valley	Smith, Wood	TX	32.578°N 95.497°W	February 10	05:16–05:25	7.11 mi (11.44 km)	300 yd (270 m)	A barn was destroyed and several metal buildings were damaged or destroyed northwest of Lindale and several homes near Mineola were damaged by fallen trees. Damage from the tornado was estimated at $400,000.
EF1	SW of Keachi	De Soto	LA	32.152°N 93.935°W	February 11	07:04–07:06	2 mi (3.2 km)	150 yd (140 m)	A metal barn was destroyed, two homes suffered minor damage, and trailers were flipped over. Many trees were snapped or uprooted.
EF1	SSW of Clarkrange	Fentress	TN	36.1534°N 85.083°W	February 11	19:03–19:04	0.52 mi (0.84 km)	75 yd (69 m)	A brief tornado snapped or uprooted dozens of trees, two of which fell on vehicles and one on a home. One home had part of its roof torn away.
EF1	E of Medford	Delaware	IN	40.11°N 85.33°W	February 11	20:30–20:31	0.11 mi (0.18 km)	100 yd (91 m)	A brief tornado damaged the roof of a barn and home.
EF0	Honaker area	Russell	VA	36.99°N 82.06°W	February 11	22:59–23:02	4.2 mi (6.8 km)	200 yd (180 m)	This weak tornado knocked over several trees and damaged one barn.

=== Spanish Fort, Texas/Lone Grove–Ardmore, Oklahoma ===
Spanish Fort, Texas/Lone Grove–Ardmore, Oklahoma
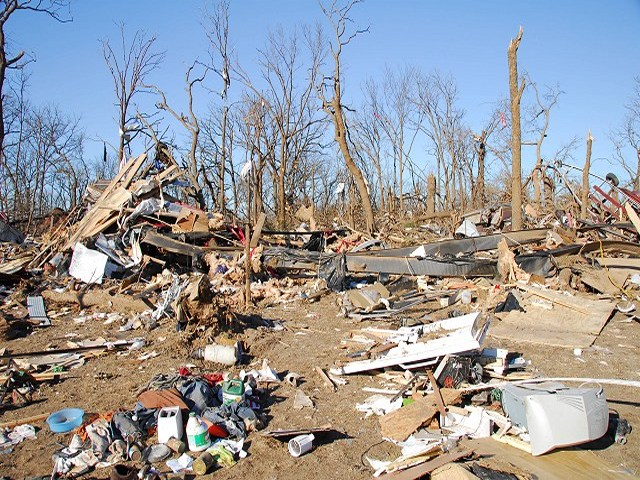
- Tornado damage in Lone Grove.

Meteorological history
- Formed: February 10, 2009, 6:48 p.m. CST
- Dissipated: February 10, 2009, 7:43 p.m. CST
- Duration: 55 minutes

EF4 tornado
- on the Enhanced Fujita scale
- Max width: 880 yards (0.50 mi; 0.80 km)
- Path length: 37 miles (60 km)
- Highest winds: 170 mph (270 km/h)

Overall effects
- Fatalities: 8
- Injuries: 46
- Areas affected: Lone Grove, Oklahoma, Ardmore, Oklahoma

The strongest tornado of the outbreak touched down as a multiple vortex tornado just south of Spanish Fort in Montague County, Texas initially snapping pecan trees. As it crossed the Red River of the South along the Texas-Oklahoma border, the tornado consolidated into a large funnel and tracked through the predominantly rural farmland of Jefferson, Love, and southwestern Carter counties, producing tree damage in all three; two homes were damaged in Love County. In central Carter County, the tornado reached low-end EF4 intensity as it struck the community of Lone Grove. 35–40 structures at the Bar K mobile home park were obliterated and homes were completely destroyed. Six deaths occurred in the mobile home park; three people were found outside their homes, two inside, and one in a field. The residents did not evacuate the mobile home park despite warnings being issued 35 minutes in advance of the tornado striking. A seventh person died in Lone Grove when their well-built home was destroyed.

After departing from Lone Grove, the tornado struck the Majestic Hills neighborhood of Ardmore, destroying eight homes, and collapsing the roofs and walls of several buildings at the Ardmore Adventist Academy. The tornado then crossed I-35, killing a truck driver before moving into rural areas and dissipating. The tornado was the strongest tornado in the state during the month of February since modern records began in 1950. The previous record was two F3 tornadoes that touched down on February 17, 1961. An additional 46 people were injured. A total of 114 homes were damaged or destroyed by the tornado and total monetary losses were estimated at $3 million.

== Non-tornadic events ==
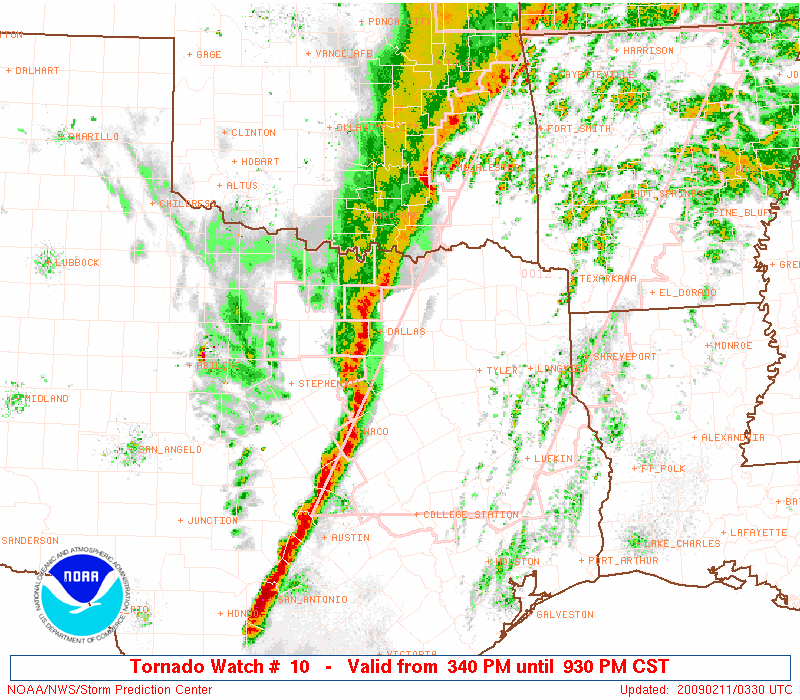
A line of severe thunderstorms in Texas on February 10

Power outages by state
State	Power outages	Source
Alabama	8,300+	
Arkansas	315,324	
Connecticut	8,486	
Delaware	4,600	
Illinois	14,590	
Indiana	70,695	
Kentucky	161,588	
Louisiana	12,000	
Massachusetts	360+	
Maryland	50,820	
Michigan	57,000	
Missouri	7,629	
New Jersey	93,816	
New York	84,624	
Ohio	585,775	
Oklahoma	61,000	
Pennsylvania	400,000+	
Tennessee	74,052	
Texas	15,000	
Virginia	28,059	
West Virginia	225,000	
Total	2,278,718+	

During the evening of February 10, a long line of severe thunderstorms developed along the tail-end of a cold front in central Texas. Meteorologists predicted embedded supercell thunderstorms that could produce hail up to 2.5 inches (6.4 cm) in diameter and wind gusts up to 90 mph (140 km/h). North of the squall line, bow echo thunderstorms developed in Missouri, causing widespread wind damage. By the morning of February 11, the squall line reached as far southeast as eastern Louisiana, where winds were recorded in excess of 70 mph (110 km/h) along with hail up to 1 inch (2.5 cm) in diameter. Around 12 pm EST (17:00 UTC), the first line of thunderstorms significantly weakened, but a new, narrow line developed in eastern Kentucky and Tennessee. A strong, deep layer wind field prevented a number of tornadoes from forming but instead caused widespread wind damage. Throughout the day, the line of low-topped thunderstorms continued eastward, reaching Ohio and West Virginia by 4 pm EST (21:00 UTC). Several hours later, the line broke apart, with the strongest storms tracking through Pennsylvania. By February 12, rain showers, accompanied by high winds up to 60 mph (97 km/h), affected most of the Northeastern United States. The large-scale damaging wind event left an estimated $1.7 billion (2009 USD) in losses.

=== West South Central states ===
In addition to the strong tornadoes, Oklahoma was affected by high winds and large hail. The largest hailstones were observed in Okesa at 4.5 inches (11 cm) in diameter. Numerous cars were hit and several houses sustained roof damage; the cost of the hail damage was estimated at $100,000. Heavy rains produced by the storms also caused isolated flooding, inundating numerous streets. A lightning bolt struck an oil tank, igniting a fire. The most significant wind damage occurred in Atoka and Coal counties where winds up to 70 mph (110 km/h) destroyed two mobile homes, several barns, and outbuildings. Gusts peaked at 81 mph (130 km/h) in McIntosh and Pawnee counties. Throughout the state, an estimated 61,000 people lost power: 29,000 lost power due to thunderstorms and 32,000 due to tornadoes.

Weather radar loop of a severe thunderstorm near Mineola, Texas

Strong straight-line winds of 70–80 mph (110–130 km/h) caused significant damage in Hamilton County, Texas. Barns, sheds, and outbuildings were destroyed with some having debris strewn 1.5 mi (2.4 km) downstream. Several mobile homes near Hamilton sustained damage after tree limbs fell on them. In Huron, several outbuildings were damaged or destroyed and a permanent building was damaged at a youth retreat center. An estimated 15,000 residences were without power following the storms in Texas. Three people were injured in McGregor when their home was destroyed.

In Arkansas, high winds produced by the squall line knocked out power to 315,324 residences and caused widespread structural damage. Trees and power lines were brought down in eight counties, and several homes in Independence and Van Buren County sustained damage. Winds estimated at 80 mph (130 km/h) in Van Buren blew a barn onto AR 9. Hundreds of trees were blown down, many of which fell on homes. Winds estimated up to 85 mph (137 km/h) caused extensive damage to homes, primarily from fallen trees, and injured three people. In Conway County, a sawmill and two barns were destroyed, while several homes and a church also sustained damage. Damaging straight-line winds affected northwestern Louisiana, downing many trees and power lines. Several homes were damaged by fallen trees in Shreveport. Approximately 12,000 residences lost power in the state.

=== Midwest ===
In Missouri, high winds caused widespread damage and knocked out power to 7,629 residences. Several homes and businesses lost their windows due to 65 mph (105 km/h) wind gusts produced within squall lines. Flooding and high winds in Michigan knocked out power to about 57,000 residences. In southern Michigan, upwards of 0.8 inches (2.0 cm) of rain fell, leading to faster snowmelt.

A tight pressure gradient behind the cold front produced strong winds across portions of Indiana and Illinois, with many areas seeing sustained winds of 35 to 45 mph (56 to 72 km/h) with gusts up to 70 mph (110 km/h). Heavy rain, warmer temperatures, and snow melt contributed to saturated grounds. In the town of Carmel, a total of 2.75 inches (70 mm) of rain fell. The combination of these factors swelled the Wabash River, leading to widespread flooding of low-lying areas. The river remained above flood-stage through February 23. Floods affected portions of Fountain, Parke, Sullivan, Tippecanoe, Vermillion, Vigo, and Warren counties. In southwestern counties, the White River reached nearly 4 ft (1.2 m) above flood-stage, inundating low-lying areas and some roads. The river remained above flood-stage through February 22. Flood gates were erected in Hazleton as water reached a local sports field. Non-thunderstorm wind gusts peaked at an estimated 80 mph (130 km/h) in Crawford and Tippecanoe counties; the highest measured value was 73 mph (117 km/h) in Hamilton County. In Tippecanoe County, several homes had shingles and siding blown off and fallen trees blocked roads. Winds in southwestern Indiana damaged power lines weakened from the ice storm in late January. A total of 14,590 residences lost power in Indiana. Several large trees were brought down by high winds, one of which fell on a home in South Bend.

A total of 70,695 residences lost power in Illinois. Rainfall up to 4 inches (100 mm) fell throughout most of the state. Several major roadways were covered in flood waters. The Little Wabash River overflowed its banks and inundated nearby roads. Elevated waters along the Wabash River in Indiana traveled south into Illinois by February 13, with Wabash and White counties experiencing flooding. The river crested at 24.86 ft (7.58 m) in Mount Carmel, nearly 5 ft (1.5 m) above flood-stage on February 19. Strong winds on the backside of the cold front affected large portions of the state, with gusts generally reaching 50 to 60 mph (80 to 97 km/h). Some minor damage resulted from these winds.

In Ohio, 70 mph (110 km/h) wind gusts led to a highway accident that killed a truck driver. The high winds also caused significant damage throughout the state. Heavy rains produced by the same system inundated several streets in flood-prone towns in Ohio. In Scioto County, the high winds destroyed a brick house and brought down power lines. The most significant damage resulted from the strong pressure gradient behind the frontal system. Thousands of tree were knocked down or uprooted by winds gusting in excess of 75 mph (121 km/h), cutting power to 585,775 residences. Ten railroad cars were knocked off their tracks near Shelby. Several hundred homes lost shingles and gutters due to the winds. Wind also overturned two semi-trailers, though the drivers of both vehicles were unharmed. A vacant school building in Epworth lost its entire roof. Some windows were damaged or broken by flying debris or fallen trees. Power outages forced numerous schools to close for at least two days following the storm. A large barn was leveled just north of Brighton in Lorain County by 64 mph (103 km/h) winds. Throughout the state, damages from the storm system amounted to $4.7 million.

=== Northeastern states ===
Hurricane-force wind gusts up to 92 mph (148 km/h) caused significant damage and power losses in Pennsylvania. Throughout the state, at least 400,000 residences lost power due to the winds. Allegheny Power stated that the loss of power due to this system was the largest ever experienced by the company. Thousands of trees and power lines were brought down by strong winds and numerous homes sustained significant damage. Although most of the damage to homes consisted of shingle damage, several homes lost gutters and had portions of their siding blown off. In Pottstown, a large portion of the roof of a four-story building was blown off, forcing residents to evacuate the building. An 18 ft (5.5 m) pillar was knocked down at the First Moravian Church in Easton. In Northampton County, a fire sparked by fallen power lines destroyed a barn and partially melted a nearby metal shed. The blaze was fully contained by 40 firefighters. Another fire sparked by fallen power lines destroyed a garage in Lower Merion Township. In Philadelphia, the roof of a portable classroom began to peel off, forcing the forty students inside to evacuate to a safer structure. A large tree fell through one house and severely damaged the roof of a nearby home. Numerous major highways and local streets were shut down for several hours to allow cleanup crews to clear debris. Throughout the state, damages from the storm system amounted to $3.7 million.

In upstate New York, winds in excess of 50 mph (80 km/h) shattered windows, toppled numerous trees, and brought down power lines, cutting power to more than 50,000 residences. Unseasonably warm temperatures and heavy rains from the storm system increased the snowmelt rate in northern areas of the state. In Genesee County, an estimated 2 to 5 inches (5.1 to 12.7 cm) of the snowpack melted, triggering flash floods along several rivers. The Tonawanda Creek reached a height of 14.38 ft (4.38 m), 2.38 ft (0.73 m) above flood stage. Several homes were inundated by flood waters throughout the region. In all, 84,624 residences lost power in New York State. The storm system continued producing gusty winds through February 12, which caused tree damage and power outages, and killed a construction worker in the New York City metropolitan area. The construction worker was killed after a cinder block wall collapsed due to high-winds. Winds in the city gusted to 65 mph (105 km/h) in the Bronx. Throughout Long Island, an estimated 4,000 people lost power.

In New Jersey, strong winds gusted up to 55 mph (89 km/h), bringing down tree limbs that killed two people. A total of 93,816 residences were also left without power at the height of the storm. High winds on the backside of the storm brought down a power line that sparked a small fire in Galloway Township, burning a total of 40 acres (16 ha). A total of 8,486 Connecticut residences were left without power after high winds damaged numerous power lines and tree limbs. Downed wires delayed Metro-North service on the New Haven Line. In Massachusetts, gusts up to 55 mph (89 km/h) brought down several trees and cut power to residences in Middleborough, Boston, Brookline and Hingham. The Western Massachusetts Electric Company reported that at least 360 residences lost power during the storm. Westerly winds and enhanced moisture from lakes led to 3 to 6 in (7.6 to 15.2 cm) of snow falling in parts of The Berkshires.

=== Elsewhere ===
In Mississippi, strong winds on the backside of the cold front blew a metal roof off a power company building, bringing down several trees and power lines. Progressing into Alabama, the initial squall line brought locally severe thunderstorms with a peak gust of 75 mph (121 km/h) near Cherokee. Some areas saw trees downed and homes damaged. The more significant effects resulted from the pressure gradient winds on the backside of the storm, with widespread damaging winds. Trees were downed in many areas, some of which caused power outages, and a few homes had roof damage. Three people were trapped in their apartment in Florence when a tree fell on the building. A downed power line sparked a fire that burned 15 acres (6.1 hectares) a few miles southwest of Leighton. At least 8,300 customers lost power in various parts of the state. In Huntsville, a car carrying four people lost control on rain-slicked roads and crashed into a van, killing one of the occupants and injuring the other three. Effects in Georgia were largely limited to scattered instances of downed trees and power lines across northern and central parts of the state. Peak gusts were estimated at 58 mph (93 km/h).

Winds of 55 to 65 mph (89 to 105 km/h) affected the majority of Kentucky, resulting in extensive power outages. A total of 161,588 residences lost power, exacerbating the effects of an ice storm two weeks earlier. Numerous counties reported downed trees and some structural damage, mainly from the fallen trees. A peak gust of 73 mph (117 km/h) was recorded at Owensboro–Daviess County Regional Airport in western Kentucky. At least 2,500 homes suffered some degree of damage in southwestern Kentucky. Several homes had their roof torn off in Cadiz and two brick buildings collapsed in Morganfield. In eastern Kentucky, approximately 90 percent of Williamsburg lost power; five homes lost their roof in the city. One fatality occurred in Kentucky when a utility worker was knocked over by high winds and fell 30 ft (9.1 m) to his death while trying to restore power. Widespread damage to trees occurred across most of Tennessee as the storm moved through, with Central Tennessee and East Tennessee being more severely affected. Many areas estimated or measured winds in excess of 60 mph (97 km/h), with peak gusts estimated at 86 mph (138 km/h) near Collinwood and Lawrenceburg. Mostly minor damage to homes was reported in multiple counties; some had their roof significantly damaged. Widespread power outages occurred, with a total of 74,052 residences losing service. In Collinwood, the doors and roofs of three dry kilns at a Hughes Hardwood were blown in or torn off. Several brush and structure fires ignited during the storm in Washington County were worsened by the winds, one of which destroyed two buildings.

One person was killed by high winds in Davy, West Virginia when a gymnasium roof collapsed. Throughout the state, power was knocked out to an estimated 225,000 residences. In Montgomery County, Virginia, winds knocked down power lines which sparked two brush fires, one of which burned a total of 12 acres (4.9 ha). Winds up to 65 mph (105 km/h) cut power to 28,059 residences in the state. The strong winds also cut power to 50,820 residences in Maryland.

== Aftermath ==
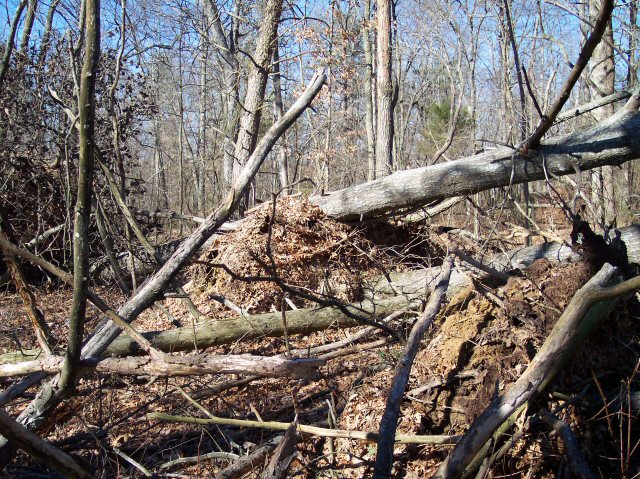
Tree damage from the EF1 tornado in Tennessee

In the wake of the tornado outbreak, law enforcement officers, including 30 National Guard troops, were sent to Lone Grove to assist with rescue efforts. The American Red Cross opened shelters in Ardmore, Edmond, and Oklahoma City. About 100 volunteers from the Sorghum Mill Estates Neighborhood Association traveled to affected areas in Edmond to help with cleanup efforts. A local restaurant provided free meals to the volunteers as they assisted relief workers. The Salvation Army had two canteens in Oklahoma City, one in Lone Grove, and one in Perkins. About 2,000 meals, drinks, and snacks were provided by the Salvation Army to emergency responders. Feed the Children sent two truckloads of relief supplies to Carter County. They also sent three food trucks, containing a total of 619 meals, 900 drinks, and about 500 snacks, to Ardmore. On February 22, the New Life Baptist Church sent drinks and prepackaged snacks, along with items needed for clean-up. Baptist Disaster Relief assisted in Lone Grove with food and emotional care. The Oklahoma City Thunder of the National Basketball Association (NBA) gave away two tickets to anyone who made a donation of $25 or an equivalent amount of food to benefit victims of the tornado. A concert featuring Chris Cagle and other local musicians at Heritage Hall in Ardmore raised over $18,000 to benefit Carter County tornado victims. Another concert set up by the Salvation Army raised $2,300 more for victims.

The Governor of Oklahoma Brad Henry declared a State of Emergency in 17 counties and described the outbreak as the worst natural disaster he had seen since becoming governor. On February 15, President Obama approved Henry's request for federal assistance in Carter, Logan and Oklahoma counties. A disaster recovery center was set up by the Federal Emergency Management Agency (FEMA) on February 20. Homeowners were allowed to borrow $200,000 to repair damages to their home or find a temporary or permanent shelter. They were also allowed to borrow up to $40,000 to replace lost property. Businesses were allowed to borrow up to $2 million for damage repair, property loss, and economic loss. By February 23, about $781,000 had been given in federal grants. On February 25, FEMA approved Governor Henry's request for public assistance in Carter, Coal and Love counties. The estimated cost to clear the 7,000 tons of debris in Lone Grove was placed at $500,000, of which $90,000 has been paid for by FEMA. The Department of Homeland Security offered to assist with the reconstruction of homes and businesses and to support those who were left homeless.

== See also ==
- Weather of 2009
- List of North American tornadoes and tornado outbreaks
- List of F4 and EF4 tornadoes
  - List of F4 and EF4 tornadoes (2000–2009)
- List of United States tornadoes from January to March 2009
