= List of United States tornadoes from January to March 2009 =

This is a list of all tornadoes that were confirmed by local offices of the National Weather Service in the United States from January to March 2009.

== United States yearly total ==
Confirmed tornadoes by Enhanced Fujita rating
EFU	EF0	EF1	EF2	EF3	EF4	EF5	Total
0	695	348	82	20	2	0	1159

== January ==
Confirmed tornadoes by Enhanced Fujita rating
EFU	EF0	EF1	EF2	EF3	EF4	EF5	Total
0	4	2	0	0	0	0	6

=== January 3 event ===
List of confirmed tornadoes – Saturday, January 3, 2009 (Note: All dates are based on the local time zone where the tornado touched down; however, all times are in Coordinated Universal Time for consistency.)
EF#	Location	County / Parish	State	Start Coord.	Time (UTC)	Path length	Max width	Summary
EF1	W of Stringer	Smith	MS	31.875°N 89.331°W	19:13–19:14	0.93 mi (1.50 km)	175 yd (160 m)	Three houses sustained minor damage and several chicken houses were heavily damaged. Some fencing and a carport were also blown over.

=== January 6 event ===
List of confirmed tornadoes – Tuesday, January 6, 2009
EF#	Location	County / Parish	State	Start Coord.	Time (UTC)	Path length	Max width	Summary
EF0	Holland	Chattooga	GA	34.3227°N 85.3844°W	22:05–22:08	2.1 mi (3.4 km)	100 yd (91 m)	A brief tornado embedded within a larger area of damaging straight-line winds produced spotty tree damage. Light to moderate damage was also observed to the roofs of three buildings and several outbuildings, although it may have been from the damaging winds and not the tornado itself.

=== January 7 event ===
List of reported tornadoes - Wednesday, January 7, 2009
EF#	Location	County / Parish	Coord.	Time (UTC)	Path length	Path width^{†}	Comments/Damage
Georgia
EF0	SE of Forsyth	Monroe	32.98°N 83.89°W	0800 – 0804	2.9 miles (4.7 km)	100 yd (91 m)	Several houses were damaged with one sustaining moderate roof damage. Several trees were knocked down.

=== January 10 event ===
List of reported tornadoes - Saturday, January 10, 2009
EF#	Location	County / Parish	Coord.	Time (UTC)	Path length	Path width^{†}	Comments/Damage
Mississippi
EF0	W of Lauderdale	Lauderdale	32.49°N 88.59°W	2133 – 2136	1.9 miles (3.1 km)	30 yd (27 m)	Damage limited to several trees along its track.
Alabama
EF1	McIntosh	Washington	31.27°N 88.03°W	2305 – 2308	1.6 miles (2.6 km)	200 yd (180 m)	Several houses damaged, one of which lost much of its roof. An industrial plant was also damaged. Numerous pine trees were snapped.

=== January 24 event ===
List of reported tornadoes - Saturday, January 24, 2009
EF#	Location	County / Parish	Coord.	Time (UTC)	Path length	Path width^{†}	Comments/Damage
California
EF0	SSW of Codora	Glenn	39.35°N 122.03°W	2300 – 2301	0.1 miles (160 m)	40 yd (37 m)	Brief tornado damaged a barn and a chicken coop.

== February ==
Confirmed tornadoes by Enhanced Fujita rating
EFU	EF0	EF1	EF2	EF3	EF4	EF5	Total
0	11	17	4	3	1	0	36

=== February 9 event ===
List of reported tornadoes - Monday, February 9, 2009
EF#	Location	County / Parish	Coord.	Time (UTC)	Path length	Path width^{†}	Comments/Damage
California
EF0	SW of Merced	Merced	37.20°N 120.60°W	1932 – 1934	0.1 miles (160 m)	20 yd (18 m)	Brief tornado touchdown with no damage.

=== February 10 event ===
List of confirmed tornadoes – Wednesday, February 10, 2009
EF#	Location	County / Parish	State	Start Coord.	Time (UTC)	Path length	Max width	Summary
EF1	NNW of Wiley Post Airport	Oklahoma	OK	35.5553°N 97.6397°W	20:36–20:37	0.7 mi (1.1 km)	75 yd (69 m)	This was the first of five tornadoes produced by a supercell in northwestern areas of the Oklahoma City metropolitan area. This brief tornado touched down in a large shopping center along SH-3 and caused extensive roof damage to several structures. It then moved into a residential neighborhood where several buildings in an apartment complex saw primarily minor damage; one apartment had its roof torn off.
EF2	Western Edmond	Oklahoma, Logan	OK	35.6631°N 97.5309°W	20:53–21:05	5.7 mi (9.2 km)	250 yd (230 m)	The second tornado touched down on the west side of Edmond and traveled northeast into Logan County. Extensive damage occurred in residential areas, with the most severe damage occurring in the Oak Tree development along the Oklahoma–Logan County line. There, several homes had large portions of their roof torn off and garages destroyed. An auto body repair shop and mobile home were totally destroyed. Throughout Edmond, six homes were destroyed, eight structures received major damage, 51 received minor damage, and another 166 structures were affected. Approximately 28,500 people lost power, primarily in the Edmond area. Hundreds of trees were uprooted or significantly damaged along the tornado's path. In Oklahoma County, the tornado left an estimated 28,500 people without power. Four people suffered minor injuries. The combined damage of the two Oklahoma County tornadoes was estimated at $10.2 million.
EF1	NW of Meridian	Logan	OK	35.861°N 97.2846°W	21:24–21:26	1 mi (1.6 km)	10 yd (9.1 m)	A brief tornado tore the roof off one home and damaged the roof of another. Minor tree damage occurred.
EF1	ENE of Langston to SW of Stillwater	Payne	OK	35.953°N 97.183°W	21:39–21:59	10 mi (16 km)	50 yd (46 m)	This tornado destroyed a barn and an oilfield communications tower and snapped trees. Numerous power lines and transmission poles were brought down near an Oklahoma Gas & Electric substation, leaving 1,586 customers without power in Payne County. Most of the outages were around SH-33.
EF0	SSW of Pawnee	Pawnee	OK	36.2899°N 96.8206°W	22:35–22:37	2.6 mi (4.2 km)	400 yd (370 m)	Two barns were completely destroyed, and several homes were damaged. Power poles were also damaged, but service was restored within a day. Four cows presumed to have been "blown away" from a pasture. This was the last of five tornadoes produced by the Oklahoma metro supercell.
EF0	Southern Belcherville	Montague	TX	33.79°N 97.83°W	00:25–00:28	0.39 mi (0.63 km)	35 yd (32 m)	A brief tornado destroyed several outbuildings and two sheds and damaged the roof of one home. Two trees were uprooted and a water tank was flipped. The storm that produced this tornado later spawned the EF4 Lone Grove tornado.
EF4	S of Spanish Fort, TX to Lone Grove, OK to SSE of Springer, OK	Montague (TX), Jefferson (OK), Love (OK), Carter (OK)	TX, OK	33.93°N 97.62°W	00:45–01:43	37 mi (60 km)	880 yd (800 m)	8 deaths – See article on this tornado – 46 people were injured.
EF1	Colleyville	Tarrant	TX	32.9106°N 97.1416°W	03:15–03:17	0.47 mi (0.76 km)	100 yd (91 m)	This brief tornado touched down in the northwestern suburbs of the Dallas–Fort Worth metroplex. Damage was confined to the Caldwell Creek neighborhood where 5 homes had extensive roof or structural damage and 15 others suffered minor damage. Monetary losses were estimated at $750,000. The American Red Cross provided supplies and snacks to residents.
EF1	Southwestern Springfield	Greene	MO	37.1332°N 93.3371°W	04:43–04:49	5.42 mi (8.72 km)	75 yd (69 m)	This tornado moved along an intermittent path across southwestern and central Springfield, damaging one to two dozen houses and businesses, and toppling several trees and power lines. At least 250 residences were left without power, and damage was estimated at $350,000. The tornado occurred without being detected on radar until it had already touched down.
EF1	NNE of Garden Valley	Smith, Wood	TX	32.578°N 95.497°W	05:16–05:25	7.11 mi (11.44 km)	300 yd (270 m)	A barn was destroyed and several metal buildings were damaged or destroyed northwest of Lindale and several homes near Mineola were damaged by fallen trees. Damage from the tornado was estimated at $400,000.

=== February 11 event ===
List of confirmed tornadoes – Thursday, February 11, 2009
EF#	Location	County / Parish	State	Start Coord.	Time (UTC)	Path length	Max width	Summary
EF1	SW of Keachi	De Soto	LA	32.152°N 93.935°W	07:04–07:06	2 mi (3.2 km)	150 yd (140 m)	A metal barn was destroyed, two homes suffered minor damage, and trailers were flipped over. Many trees were snapped or uprooted.
EF1	SSW of Clarkrange	Fentress	TN	36.1534°N 85.083°W	19:03–19:04	0.52 mi (0.84 km)	75 yd (69 m)	A brief tornado snapped or uprooted dozens of trees, two of which fell on vehicles and one on a home. One home had part of its roof torn away.
EF1	E of Medford	Delaware	IN	40.11°N 85.33°W	20:30–20:31	0.11 mi (0.18 km)	100 yd (91 m)	A brief tornado damaged the roof of a barn and home.
EF0	Honaker area	Russell	VA	36.99°N 82.06°W	22:59–23:02	4.2 mi (6.8 km)	200 yd (180 m)	This weak tornado knocked over several trees and damaged one barn.
EF0	Northeastern Kapolei	Honolulu	HI	21.3398°N 158.0639°W	23:05–23:13	0.36 mi (0.58 km)	15 yd (14 m)	Tornado touched down at a golf course near H-1. Several buildings were damaged. One person sustained minor injuries while trying to help another person escape from the strong winds.

=== February 18 event ===
List of confirmed tornadoes – Wednesday, February 18, 2009
EF#	Location	County / Parish	State	Start Coord.	Time (UTC)	Path length	Max width	Summary
EF0	SW of Reynolds	Taylor	Georgia	32.49°N 84.15°W	2245 – 2249	3.85 mi (6.20 km)	33 yd (30 m)	One house was damaged and a mobile home was removed from its foundation.
EF0	Warner Robins	Houston	Georgia	32.65°N 83.60°W	2325 – 2326	50 yd (46 m)	1.4 yd (1.3 m)	Very brief tornado touched down on the runways at Robins Air Force Base with no damage reported.
EF1	SW of Watkinsville	Oconee	Georgia	33.74°N 83.43°W	2344 – 2350	5.4 mi (8.7 km)	800 yd (730 m)	Minor damage to several homes and one mobile home was shifted off its foundation. Hundreds of trees were knocked down at the Georgia Nature Center.
EF1	E of Monticello	Jasper	Georgia	33.30°N 83.60°W	0015 – 0019	3 mi (4.8 km)	440 yd (400 m)	Several houses were damaged, one of them severely. Many trees and power lines were downed as well.
EF1	SW of Eatonton	Putnam	Georgia	33.30°N 83.50°W	0019 – 0041	8.75 mi (14.08 km)	0.75 mi (1.21 km)	A restaurant and two other buildings were destroyed, and several houses sustained major damage. One person was injured.
EF3	S of Washington	Wilkes, McDuffie	Georgia	33.67°N 82.87°W	0026 – 0053	19.75 mi (31.78 km)	0.5 mi (0.80 km)	One cinder block house was flattened with debris carried over 0.5 miles (0.80 km) away. 15 other houses and a church suffered moderate to severe damage and 19 outbuildings were destroyed.
EF1	N of Rock Mills	Randolph	AL	33.23°N 85.27°W	0055 – 0056	0.85 mi (1.37 km)	500 yd (460 m)	Several hundred softwood trees were downed.
EF1	S of Porterdale	Newton	Georgia	33.51°N 83.88°W	0105 – 0109	2.85 mi (4.59 km)	200 yd (180 m)	Many trees were downed, which damaged about 30 houses in a heavily wooded subdivision.
EF1	NW of Shady Dale	Jasper	Georgia	33.45°N 83.74°W	0116 – 0126	7.2 mi (11.6 km)	440 yd (400 m)	A cottage was heavily damaged, and five houses sustained lesser damage. Over 100 trees were downed.
EF2	Moreland area	Meriwether, Coweta, Spalding	Georgia	33.22°N 84.77°W	0130 – 0202	20.4 mi (32.8 km)	1 mi (1.6 km)	Large wedge tornado caused structural damage to about 50 houses along its path, four of which were destroyed. A roof was also blown off a school and flying debris killed a horse.
EF3	E of Sparta	Hancock, Warren, Glascock	Georgia	33.26°N 82.89°W	0348 – 0403	10.4 mi (16.7 km)	500 yd (460 m)	1 death - A church, two site-built homes, and four mobile homes were destroyed and hundreds of trees were downed. The fatality took place in one of the mobile homes while three others were injured as well.
EF2	S of Cairo to Southern Thomasville to W of Eason	Grady, Thomas	Georgia	30.8043°N 84.182°W	05:50–06:12	16.38 mi (26.36 km)	400 yd (370 m)	This strong tornado struck the southern side of Thomasville, destroying nine mobile homes and 29 homes, damaging 141 other homes, and heavily damaging a hospital building. Many trees were uprooted as well.

=== February 19 event ===
List of confirmed tornadoes – Thursday, February 19, 2009
EF#	Location	County / Parish	State	Start Coord.	Time (UTC)	Path length	Max width	Summary
EF3	N of Boston	Thomas	GA	30.8239°N 83.7993°W	06:20–06:23	1.45 mi (2.33 km)	500 yd (460 m)	This tornado touched down after the Thomasville tornado dissipated. Numerous trees were snapped or twisted and many power lines were down. Several trees were stripped of their bark which warranted an EF3 rating.

=== February 27 event ===
List of reported tornadoes - Friday, February 27, 2009
EF#	Location	County / Parish	Coord.	Time (UTC)	Path length	Path width^{†}	Comments/Damage
Alabama
EF0	SE of Chelsea	Shelby	33.35°N 86.65°W	1610 – 1611	1.8 miles (2.9 km)	25 yd (23 m)	A few trees were downed and a gas station sign damaged.
EF0	N of Greensboro	Shelby	32.77°N 87.59°W	2156	50 yards (46 m)	20 yd (18 m)	Very brief tornado knocked a tree down.
Mississippi
EF0	SSW of Prairie Point	Noxubee	33.11°N 88.40°W	2136 – 2139	2.2 miles (3.5 km)	75 yd (69 m)	Brief tornado snapped several trees.
† – Maximum width of the tornado; not representative of the entire track.

=== February 28 event ===
List of reported tornadoes - Saturday, February 28, 2009
EF#	Location	County / Parish	Coord.	Time (UTC)	Path length	Path width^{†}	Comments/Damage
Alabama
EF0	SE of Buckville	Tallapoosa	32.50°N 85.87°W	1340	0.25 miles (400 m)	100 yd (91 m)	Brief tornado caused minor damage to two houses.
EF1	NNE of Ridge Grove	Lee	32.68°N 85.49°W	1356 – 1357	0.3 miles (480 m)	100 yd (91 m)	Brief tornado touched down along U.S. Route 280, causing heavy damage at a car dealership.
EF2	Salem area	Lee	32.59°N 85.26°W	1425 – 1437	8.3 miles (13.4 km)	500 yd (460 m)	At least six mobile homes and four site-built homes were either heavily damaged or destroyed. Damage was also reported to at least 17 houses, two churches, and a school. Three people sustained minor injuries.
† – Maximum width of the tornado; not representative of the entire track.

== March ==
Confirmed tornadoes by Enhanced Fujita rating
EFU	EF0	EF1	EF2	EF3	EF4	EF5	Total
0	54	46	8	3	0	0	115

- Note: 4 tornadoes were confirmed in the final totals, but do not have a listed rating.

=== March 7 event ===
List of reported tornadoes - Saturday, March 7, 2009
EF#	Location	County	Coord.	Time (UTC)	Path length	Damage
Kansas
EF0	Abbyville	Reno	37.97°N 98.13°W	2213	1 mile (1.6 km)	Brief tornado touchdown in open country.
EF0	N of Partridge	Reno	37.98°N 98.11°W	2228	1 mile (1.6 km)	Brief tornado touchdown in open country.
EF0	SW of Hutchinson	Reno	38.07°N 97.93°W	2236	unknown	Tornado spotted on an airport runway with no damage.
EF0	W of Hesston	Harvey	38.13°N 97.54°W	2315	unknown	Brief tornado touchdown in open country.
EF0	N of Medicine Lodge	Barber	37.34°N 98.58°W	0018	unknown	Tornado reported by local media on the ground for only a few seconds.
EF0	N of Attica	Harper	37.29°N 98.16°W	0121	1 mile (1.6 km)	Brief tornado touchdown in open country.
EF0	NE of Attica	Harper	37.30°N 98.12°W	0130	1 mile (1.6 km)	Brief tornado touchdown in open country with a small debris cloud noted.
EF0	NE of Norwich	Harper	37.47°N 97.83°W	0210	1 mile (1.6 km)	Brief tornado touchdown in open country.
Sources: SPC Storm Reports for 03/07/09, NWS Wichita, NWS Storm Data

=== March 8 event ===
List of reported tornadoes - Sunday, March 8, 2009
EF#	Location	County	Coord.	Time (UTC)	Path length	Damage
Illinois
EF2	Rosedale area (1st tornado)	Jersey	39.03°N 90.55°W	1556	1.5 miles (2.4 km)	Two cabins along the east side of the Illinois River sustained minor roof and siding damage, while a third cabin sustained severe damage. A fourth cabin was completely destroyed. A farmstead further northeast suffered varying degrees of damage on the property. One large machine shed sustained roof and side damage, while a small garage was destroyed. The residence home sustained minor roof damage.
EF0	Rosedale area (2nd tornado)	Jersey	39.05°N 90.54°W	1557	4 miles (6.4 km)	The roof of one machine shed was lifted and destroyed on a farmstead while tree and branches snapped along Hollow Creek Road. A water pump house was nearly destroyed.
EF1	Roodhouse area	Greene	39.47°N 90.25°W	1610	5.2 miles (8.4 km)	A church was severely damaged and a farm sustained significant damage, with 4 machine sheds completely destroyed.
EF1	Prairie area	Randolph	38.16°N 89.95°W	1625	1 mile (1.6 km)	Three homes damaged, two with minor damage and one had a portion of the roof removed.
EF1	Grigg area	Randolph	38.16°N 89.90°W	1627	2.5 miles (4.0 km)	Two mobile homes were destroyed. One person was injured.
EF1	Carlinville area	Macoupin	39.27°N 89.94°W	1630	4 miles (6.4 km)	A lumber shed was destroyed, two grain bins sustained damage, one was blown off its foundation and the other had its anchor bolts sheared off. A small shed and outbuilding was also destroyed.
EF1	Loami area	Sangamon	39.66°N 89.92°W	1632	5 miles (8.0 km)	Several houses were damaged, and many barns and outbuildings were destroyed. Two people were injured, one inside a house and another inside a barn.
EF0	Baldwin area	Washington	38.18°N 89.85°W	1633	3.8 miles (6.1 km)	Roof removed from a cinder block outbuilding.
EF2	Oakdale area	Washington	38.25°N 89.60°W	1646	5 miles (8.0 km)	Two large double-poled wooden high tension towers snapped at the base, with several pole sheds destroyed.
EF0	SE of Cordes	Washington	38.27°N 89.42°W	1656	2 miles (3.2 km)	Trees and branches snapped.
EF0	SW of Beaucoup	Washington	38.30°N 89.32°W	1701	1 mile (1.6 km)	Trees and branches snapped.
EF1	E of Texico	Jefferson	38.42°N 88.87°W	1727	2 miles (3.2 km)	A school lost parts of its roof and several houses were damaged.
EF0	Stratton area	Jefferson, Wayne	38.45°N 88.75°W	1734	4 miles (6.4 km)	Four power poles and some tree limbs were knocked over.
EF1	NNE of Wayne City	Wayne	38.42°N 88.53°W	1742	14 miles (23 km)	One mobile home damaged and moderate damage to another home. One person was injured.
EF2	N of Enterprise	Wayne, Clay	38.55°N 88.35°W	1758	6 miles (9.7 km)	Four structures were damaged with moderate to major damage to one residence. Minor damage occurred to one home in Clay County.
EF0	SW of Rooks Creek	Livingston	40.83°N 88.70°W	1801	1 mile (1.6 km)	A garage was destroyed and a barn was damaged.
EF1	S of Russellville	Lawrence, Knox (IN)	38.77°N 87.56°W	1843	4 miles (6.4 km)	A garage was destroyed and a barn was damaged. One person was injured.
EF1	E of St. George	Kankakee	41.19°N 87.72°W	1856	1 mile (1.6 km)	A few structures were damaged, and corn fields were heavily impacted.
EF1	SE of Whitaker	Kankakee	41.23°N 87.68°W	1900	1 mile (1.6 km)	Two barns and a garage were destroyed.
Missouri
EF1	Marble Hill area	Bollinger, Cape Girardeau	37.25°N 89.95°W	1715	7 miles (11 km)	Tornado ripped shingles off of six homes and three barns were destroyed.
Indiana
EF3	SW of Fayetteville	Lawrence	38.8498°N 86.6062°W	1937	2 miles (3.2 km)	Three homes were destroyed with one removed from its foundation, and 19 others were damaged. A 4.5 ton bus was shown on WTHR-TV in Indianapolis on the roof of an industrial building after the tornado picked it up and dropped it on the building. One person was injured.
EF0	N of Bedford	Lawrence	38.88°N 86.48°W	1945	0.2 miles (0.32 km)	Brief touchdown with minimal damage to a construction site.
EF1	S of Sunman	Ripley	39.14°N 85.13°W	2122	0.5 miles (0.80 km)	A house sustained minor damage, mostly to the roof. Several barns were heavily damaged.
EF1	Columbia City	Whitley	41.17°N 85.48°W	2215	1.5 miles (2.4 km)	Tornado touched down in a mobile home park. Three trailers were destroyed and over 20 others were damaged, some heavily.
Kentucky
EF1	SW of Dixon	Webster	37.47°N 87.75°W	1941	250 yards (230 m)	Four farm outbuildings and one garage were destroyed. One house had structural damage to an attached garage.
Ohio
EF0	Defiance area	Defiance	41.29°N 84.65°W	2204	5.1 miles (8.2 km)	Intermittent tornado touchdown with minor damage to several houses and trees.
Sources: SPC Storm Reports for 03/08/09, NWS St. Louis, NWS Paducah, NWS Indianapolis, NWS Northern Indiana, NWS Wilmington (OH), NWS Central Illinois, NWS Storm Data

=== March 15 event ===
List of reported tornadoes - Sunday, March 15, 2009
EF#	Location	County	Coord.	Time (UTC)	Path length	Damage
Georgia
EF0	NW of Putnam	Marion, Schley	32.27°N 84.43°W	1755	2 miles (3.2 km)	Late report of a weak tornado.
Sources: SPC Storm Reports for 03/15/09

=== March 23 event ===
List of reported tornadoes - Monday, March 23, 2009
EF#	Location	County	Coord.	Time (UTC)	Path length	Damage
Nebraska
EF0	S of Brownlee	Cherry	42.09°N 100.37°W	1845	1 mile (1.6 km)	Brief touchdown with no damage
EF1	SW of Santee	Cherry	42.48°N 97.52°W	2115	2 miles (3.2 km)	Tree damage
EF1	SE of Hickman	Lancaster	40.34°N 96.37°W	2131	2 miles (3.2 km)	Tree and farm outbuilding damage
EF2	NE of Hickman	Lancaster	40.37°N 96.35°W	2136	1 mile (1.6 km)	Farm outbuildings were destroyed, one barn lost its roof and one house was damaged
EF1	S of Eagle	Lancaster, Otoe, Cass	40.79°N 96.43°W	2141	9 miles (14 km)	Tornado hit a garage and sent a car rolling, injuring five people.
EF1	NE of Eagle	Cass	40.85°N 96.43°W	2152	4 miles (6.4 km)	A tree fell on a truck, injuring three people. There was also building damage.
EF1	NE of Alvo	Cass	40.82°N 96.43°W	2159	5 miles (8.0 km)	Farm outbuildings were destroyed, houses were damaged, trees were snapped and power poles and transmission lines were knocked down. A power line fell on a car trapping an occupant.
South Dakota
EF1	SW of Springfield	Bon Homme	42.81°N 97.97°W	2114	1 mile (1.6 km)	A machine shed was heavily damaged.
Kansas
EF0	SW of Geuda Springs	Sumner	37.06°N 97.09°W	2200	unknown	Brief touchdown in open country and spotted by KAKE-TV storm chaser
EF0	NW of Arkansas City	Cowley	37.06°N 97.07°W	2206	1 mile (1.6 km)	Damage to trees along the Arkansas River
EF0	SW of Winfield airport	Cowley	37.09°N 97.01°W	2215	unknown	Brief touchdown in open country
EF0	NE of Winfield	Cowley	37.16°N 96.52°W	2235	unknown	Brief touchdown in open country
EF1	E of Bern	Nemaha	39.96°N 95.97°W	2333	8.5 miles (13.7 km)	Numerous buildings and power poles were damaged.
Iowa
EF2	Missouri Valley area	Harrison	41.58°N 95.87°W	2305	9 miles (14 km)	A farm house was heavily damaged and seven outbuildings were destroyed. 54 rail cars were also overturned.
EF0	W of Villisca	Montgomery	40.98°N 94.91°W	0052	3 miles (4.8 km)	A grain bin was overturned and an outbuilding was damaged.
EF0	Sciola	Montgomery	41.00°N 94.59°W	0056	1.25 miles (2.01 km)	A weak outbuilding was destroyed and some trees were damaged.
EF0	ESE of Lyman	Cass	41.23°N 94.89°W	0110	5 miles (8.0 km)	Narrow tornado path with damage to silos and outbuildings.
EF0	S of Wiota	Cass	41.22°N 94.52°W	0123	1 mile (1.6 km)	Narrow tornado path with minor damage.
Sources: SPC Storm Reports for 03/23/09, NWS Des Moines, NWS Omaha, NWS Topeka, NCDC Storm Data

=== March 24 event ===
List of reported tornadoes - Tuesday, March 24, 2009
EF#	Location	County/ Parish	Coord.	Time (UTC)	Path length	Damage
Louisiana
EF1	WNW of Jonesboro	Jackson	32.24°N 92.73°W	0410	1 mile (1.6 km)	
Oklahoma
EF0	SE of Pawnee	Pawnee		0629	3.5 miles (5.6 km)	A mobile home was damaged and a storage barn was destroyed. Numerous trees were snapped.
Sources: SPC Storm Reports for 03/24/09, NWS Tulsa

=== March 25–26 event ===
This event covers through the morning of March 26, which was due to a continuous bow echo/line.

List of reported tornadoes - Wednesday, March 25, 2009
EF#	Location	County/ Parish	Coord.	Time (UTC)	Path length	Damage
Mississippi
EF1	S of Meridian	Lauderdale	32.25°N 88.71°W	1559	5.5 miles (8.9 km)	Many trees were knocked down, damaging a church. A house also lost its roof.
EF0	S of Edwards	Hinds		0444	3 miles (4.8 km)	A house lost its roof and several other houses sustained minor damage.
Louisiana
EF0	E of Pleasant Hill	Natchitoches	31.85°N 93.42°W	0050	unknown	Brief tornado in a wooded area with damage limited to trees.
Sources: SPC Storm Reports for 03/25/09, NWS Jackson

List of reported tornadoes - Thursday, March 26, 2009
EF#	Location	County/ Parish	Coord.	Time (UTC)	Path length	Damage
Mississippi
EF1	N of Clinton	Hinds, Madison		0500	12 miles (19 km)	Hundreds of trees were uprooted along its track.
EF1	NW of Madison (1st tornado)	Madison		0517	4.5 miles (7.2 km)	Several houses sustained damage, mostly to their roofs. Many trees were snapped.
EF0	NW of Madison (2nd tornado)	Madison		0520	1 mile (1.6 km)	Minor shingle damage to several houses and minor tree damage.
EF3	Magee area	Simpson, Smith		0637	17.5 miles (28.2 km)	Severe damage to 60 houses, many of which were destroyed. A large well-built church was also destroyed. A warehouse and a radio tower also sustained major damage and extensive tree damage was reported. 25 people were injured.
EF1	E of Montrose	Jasper, Newton		0731	17 miles (27 km)	Several houses were damaged, at least four of which were heavily damaged. An old church building was destroyed.
EF2	N of Soso	Jones		0743	9 miles (14 km)	Numerous houses were damaged, with a well-built house heavily damaged. Several warehouses were destroyed. Several mobile homes were damaged, one of which was destroyed. One person were injured.
EF0	Pascagoula	Jackson	30.37°N 88.55°W	1033	250 yards (230 m)	Brief tornado touched down at Pascagoula High School with minor damage at its fields. Several traffic lights were damaged.
Louisiana
EF1	E of Independence	Tangipahoa	30.64°N 90.47°W	0658	0.75 miles (1.21 km)	Seven houses were damaged and two mobile homes were heavily damaged, one of which was destroyed. One person was injured.
EF0	SSE of Slidell	St. Tammany	30.25°N 89.76°W	0843	250 yards (230 m)	Brief tornado in a residential subdivision with minor tree damage but no building damage.
Alabama
EF1	WNW of Ashcraft Corner	Lamar, Fayette	33.54°N 87.95°W	0820	3.33 miles (5.36 km)	Two homes, one business and five outbuildings were damaged.
EF0	Alabaster	Shelby	33.21°N 86.86°W	0950	3.75 miles (6.04 km)	Brief tornado damaged three houses near exit 238 on Interstate 65.
EF1	E of Appleton	Escambia	31.22°N 87.11°W	1155	2.09 miles (3.36 km)	Several houses and outbuildings were damaged and a barn was destroyed.
Sources: SPC Storm Reports for 03/25/09, NWS Jackson, NWS New Orleans/Baton Rouge, NWS Mobile, NWS Birmingham

=== March 26 event ===
List of reported tornadoes - Thursday, March 26, 2009
EF#	Location	County/ Parish	Coord.	Time (UTC)	Path length	Damage
Texas
EF0	E of Bonita	Montague	33.45°N 97.34°W	0020	unknown	Brief tornado without damage
EF0	NW of Muenster	Cooke	33.39°N 97.25°W	0134	unknown	Reported on the ground by fire department. No known damage
Louisiana
EF1	E of Gonzales	Ascension	30.22°N 90.87°W	0412	1.25 miles (2.01 km)	Tornado embedded in an evening line of activity. One structure was destroyed and 30 others were damaged, 10 of them heavily including a large commercial building.
EF0	W of Killian	Livingston	30.22°N 90.39°W	0428	unknown	Minor damage to a barn, a trailer was overturned and numerous trees were uprooted
EF1	N of Pearl River	St. Tammany	30.42°N 89.75°W	0630	0.33 miles (0.53 km)	Brief tornado with heavy roof damage to three houses.
Mississippi
EF1	N of Diamondhead	Hancock	30.64°N 89.37°W	0645	7 miles (11 km)	A church sustained significant roof damage and an outbuilding was destroyed.
Sources: SPC Storm Reports for 03/26/09, NWS New Orleans/Baton Rouge, NCDC Storm Data

=== March 27 event ===
List of reported tornadoes - Friday, March 27, 2009
EF#	Location	County/Parish	Coord.	Time (UTC)	Path length	Damage
Florida
EF0	SW of Mossy Head	Walton	30.43°N 86.20°W	1137	unknown	Numerous trees were uprooted, which blocked lanes of Interstate 10.
EF0	W of Round Lake	Jackson	30.39°N 85.23°W	1320	unknown	A home and several boats were damaged and trees were downed.
North Carolina
EF0	SE of Lumberton	Robeson	34.56°N 78.97°W	2032	2.3 miles (3.7 km)	A shed was destroyed and a mobile home was damaged.
EF2	E of Parkton	Robeson	34.89°N 78.96°W	2102	2 miles (3.2 km)	An empty house and a mobile home were destroyed. One person was injured.
EF1	SE of Hope Mills	Cumberland	34.95°N 78.93°W	2113	5 miles (8.0 km)	Several houses and businesses - including a large research building - sustained mostly roof damage. A tractor-trailer was overturned on Interstate 95 as well.
EF1	Greenville	Pitt	35.60°N 77.37°W	2205	0.5 miles (0.80 km)	Brief tornado with minor damage to about 40 houses.
EF1	W of Hookerton	Greene	35.42°N 77.62°W	2205	1.5 miles (2.4 km)	Minor to moderate damage to several homes.
EF0	E of Mingo	Sampson	35.11°N 78.31°W	2235	unknown	Numerous trees were downed and a barn was damaged.
EF0	SE of Spiveys Corner	Sampson	35.13°N 78.30°W	2240	1 mile (1.6 km)	Minor damage to five homes.
EF0	SE of Coats Xrds	Johnston	35.31°N 78.30°W	2320	unknown	Numerous trees were downed.
Louisiana
EF0	W of Gardner	Rapides	31.27°N 92.78°W	2110	2 miles (3.2 km)	Many trees were downed, some of which fell onto houses and vehicles.
EF0	SSW of Brownsville-Bawcon	Ouachita	32.36°N 92.26°W	0357	unknown	Trees were downed and a fence was damaged.
Texas
EF0	SE of Cleveland	Liberty	30.20°N 95.05°W	2132	unknown	The roof of a business was blown off and another building had window damage.
EF0	N of Votaw	Hardin	30.26°N 94.40°W	2212	unknown	Brief touchdown in a field with no damage.
Sources: SPC Storm Reports for 03/27/09, NWS Wilmington (NC), NWS Raleigh, NWS Newport/Morehead City, NWS Lake Charles, LA, NWS Raleigh (Event Summary), NCDC Storm Data

=== March 28 event ===
List of reported tornadoes - Saturday, March 28, 2009
EF#	Location	County	Coord.	Time (UTC)	Path length	Damage
Mississippi
EF1	SE of Raleigh	Smith	31.91°N 89.46°W	0758	1 mile (1.6 km)	Four houses sustained minor to moderate damage. Two sheds were also destroyed and trees were damaged.
Georgia
EF0	NW of Vienna	Dooly	32.13°N 83.84°W	1450	500 yards (460 m)	Brief tornado touchdown
Kentucky
EF1	SE of Morganfield	Union	37.68°N 87.91°W	2123	2.5 miles (4.0 km)	Two camper trailer were overturned and a barn lost its roof. Several trees were damaged.
EF3	Corydon area	Union, Henderson	37.79°N 87.71°W	2143	12 miles (19 km)	Six homes were destroyed with 70 others damaged - 10 of them heavily. One vehicle was thrown 1/4 mile (400 m) from its location. Two people were injured.
EF0	SE of Owensboro	Daviess	37.42°N 87.01°W	2238	unknown	Small rope tornado observed by chasers with no damage
South Carolina
EF1	SW of Davis Station	Clarendon	33.34°N 80.17°W	2131	4 miles (6.4 km)	Tornado caught on video by trained spotters causing damage only to trees.
Tennessee
EF1	NE of Ashland City	Cheatham	36.28°N 87.06°W	2238	5 miles (8.0 km)	A modular home was destroyed with damage to three other homes. Numerous trees were snapped.
EF1	Murfreesboro	Rutherford	35.85°N 86.43°W	2350	1.1 miles (1.8 km)	Several businesses were damaged, including the local Boys and Girls Club and a shopping plaza which were heavily damaged. Numerous houses were also damaged. Damages from the tornado were estimated to be over $4.4 million.
EF1	Huntland	Franklin	35.15°N 86.27°W	0001	1.5 miles (2.4 km)	Minor damage to a house and a barn. Numerous trees snapped or broken.
EF0	SE of Dunlap	Sequatchie	35.35°N 85.36°W	0153	1 mile (1.6 km)	Damage to trees.
North Carolina
EF2	N of Clarkton	Bladen	34.54°N 78.67°W	0108	1.6 miles (2.6 km)	One home was significantly damaged with a cinder block storage being destroyed and part of the back of the home being lifted from the foundation. Three other homes were damaged. Damage to farm and other storage/cinder block buildings.
EF0	NW of White Lake	Bladen	34.73°N 78.52°W	0136	0.25 miles (0.40 km)	Brief touchdown with damage limited to trees.
Alabama
EF1	W of Valley Head	DeKalb	34.56°N 85.65°W	0120	2.6 miles (4.2 km)	Many trees, mostly tall pines, were uprooted. Some of them fell on a house, heavily damaging it.
EF0	NE of Pisgah	Jackson		unknown	1.6 miles (2.6 km)	Two houses sustained roof damage and a barn was heavily damaged.
Sources: SPC Storm Reports for 03/28/09, NWS Jackson, MS, NWS Nashville, NWS Paducah, NWS Wilmington, NC, NWS Huntsville, NWS Columbia, NCDC Storm Data

=== March 29 event ===
List of reported tornadoes - Saturday, March 28, 2009
EF#	Location	County	Coord.	Time (UTC)	Path length	Damage
Pennsylvania
EF1	N of Ephrata	Lancaster	40.20°N 76.18°W	2050	1.25 miles (2.01 km)	EF1 tornado destroyed several mobile homes. WHTM-TV reports injuries while witnesses reported a funnel cloud in the area of Clay Township.
Sources: SPC Reports 03/29/2009, NWS State College

=== March 31 event ===
List of reported tornadoes - Tuesday, March 31, 2009
EF#	Location	Parish	Coord.	Time (UTC)	Path length	Damage
Louisiana
EF1	E of Natchez	Natchitoches, Grant	31.67°N 93.01°W	1331	8.1 miles (13.0 km)	A barn was completely destroyed and several buildings sustained minor to moderate damage. Trees were damaged at two historic plantations.
Florida
EF0	NW of Palm Beach Gardens	Palm Beach	26.50°N 80.06°W	1930	1 mile (1.6 km)	A few residential buildings had roof damage. One fence was blown down and several trees were damaged.
EF0	Glen Ridge	Palm Beach	26.43°N 80.04°W	1950	unknown	A bus bench was flipped over, signs were blown down or damaged and tree branches broken
EF1	SW of Lee	Madison	30.17°N 83.18°W	0040	1 mile (1.6 km)	Damage to numerous large pine trees
EF1	S of Ellaville	Suwannee	30.22°N 83.10°W	0045	2 miles (3.2 km)	Damage to several farm buildings, mobile homes and chicken houses
Georgia
EF0	Norman Park	Colquitt	31.16°N 83.40°W	2212	unknown	Brief touchdown in an open field
Sources: SPC Storm Reports for 03/31/09, NWS Shreveport, NCDC Storm Data

== See also ==
- Tornadoes of 2009
- List of United States tornadoes in April 2009
