= 2009 Lone Grove tornado =

2009 tornado in Oklahoma, U.S.

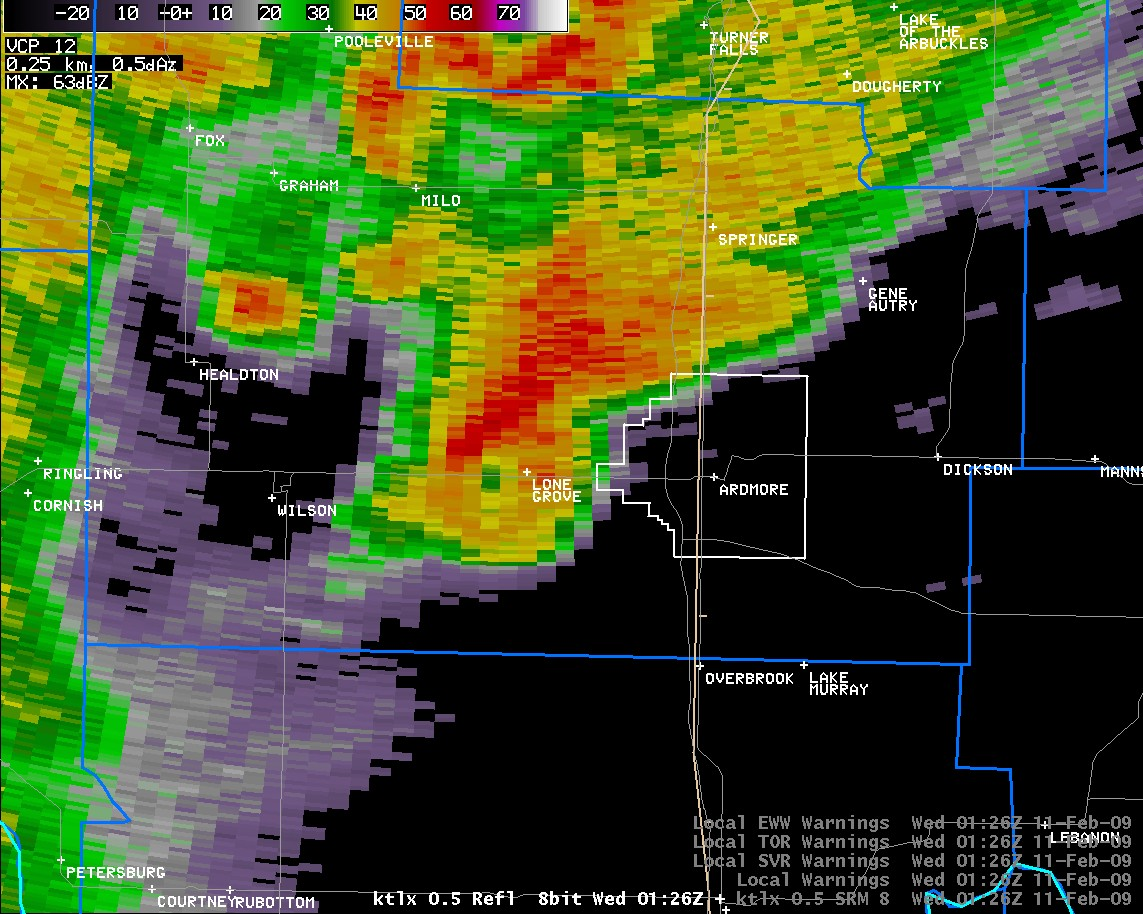
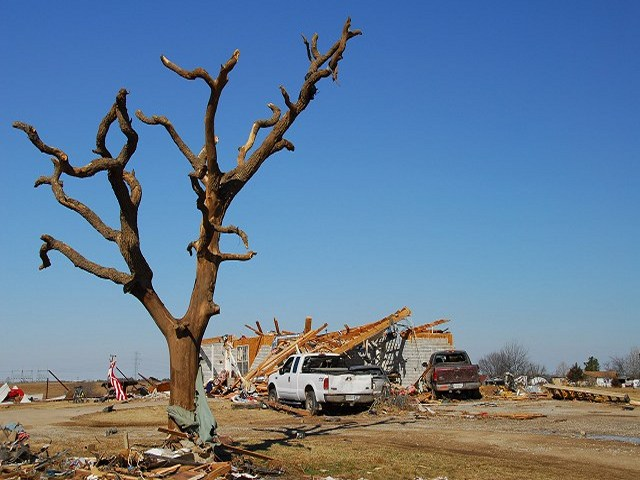
- Clockwise from top: The tornado as seen in or near Lone Grove; Intense damage from the tornado in Lone Grove; Radar imagery of the tornado approaching Lone Grove

Meteorological history
- Formed: February 10, 2009, 6:48 p.m. CST
- Dissipated: February 10, 2009, 7:43 p.m. CST
- Duration: 55 minutes

EF4 tornado
- on the Enhanced Fujita scale
- Max width: 880 yards (0.50 mi; 0.80 km)
- Path length: 37 miles (60 km)
- Highest winds: 170 mph (270 km/h)

Overall effects
- Fatalities: 8
- Injuries: 46
- Damage: $3 million (2009 USD)
- Areas affected: Lone Grove, Oklahoma, Ardmore, Oklahoma,
- Power outages: 3,500
- Houses destroyed: 114
- Part of the February 2009 North American storm complex and Tornadoes of 2009

During the evening hours of February 10, 2009, a deadly, long-lived, and violent nocturnal tornado that was part of a small tornado outbreak tracked 37 miles (59 km) through portions of Jefferson County, Love County, and Carter County in Oklahoma, after initially touching down in Montague County, Texas, near Spanish Fort. The tornado devastated the city of Lone Grove, killing eight people, injuring another 46, and severely damaging and destroying numerous businesses, mobile homes, and single-family homes throughout the area. Six of the fatalities occurred in mobile homes, with the seventh being in a well-built home that was destroyed at EF4 intensity. The eighth fatality occurred when a truck driving on Interstate 35 was directly hit by the tornado, resulting in the driver's death. Around 114 homes were destroyed, with some mobile homes reported to have been completely obliterated. The tornado was the deadliest and most intense to strike Oklahoma during the month of February since reliable records began in 1950, and had the highest death toll of any tornado in the United States in 2009.

== Meteorological synopsis ==
On February 7, 2009, the Storm Prediction Center highlighted a risk for severe weather in the Southern Plains for February 10. This turned into a moderate risk for much of central and southern Oklahoma by the morning of February 10 as low-level moisture, significant surface heating, and much colder air at higher altitudes created an incredibly unstable atmosphere, especially for the time of year. At 6:50 a.m. CST, (Note: All times listed in the article are in CST unless stated otherwise.) the Norman Hazardous Weather Outlook warned the potential for tornadoes across central Oklahoma.

As the day progressed, thunderstorms began to develop along a surface front, with the first signs of development occurring around 1 p.m. Two of these thunderstorms developed into tornadic supercells, with the first occurring over central Oklahoma and producing various tornadoes, the most significant of which was rated at EF2 intensity after striking the city of Edmond, Oklahoma. Following the first supercell, a second thunderstorm began to develop rapidly over the counties Young and Stephens in northern Texas, becoming supercellular by 5:30 p.m. The supercell began to enter an environment primed for tornadic development, with the tornado that struck Lone Grove touching down near Spanish Fort, Texas, at 6:48 p.m.

== Tornado summary ==
=== Touchdown and beginning ===
The tornado initially touched down after sunset in Montague County just south of Spanish Fort, Texas at 6:48 p.m. and began snapping pecan trees up to 30 inches in diameter at EF1 intensity. Around this time, a tornado warning was issued for portions of Love, Carter, and Jefferson Counties. The tornado reportedly organized from a multi-vortex tornado into a large, singular funnel as it crossed the Red River of the South into Jefferson County in southern Oklahoma. Due to these observations, the tornado warning continued for Carter County. The tornado tracked northeast into Love County, Oklahoma at EF2 intensity as it crossed rural farmland and damaged two homes.

The tornado crossed into Carter County at 7:10 p.m., where it inflicted scattered damage across sparsely populated areas. As the tornado crossed Highway 70, it struck a 2005 pickup truck, tossing it violently and causing significant damage to the vehicle. The driver, who was a member of the Lone Grove police department, sustained minor injuries.

=== Impacts in Lone Grove ===
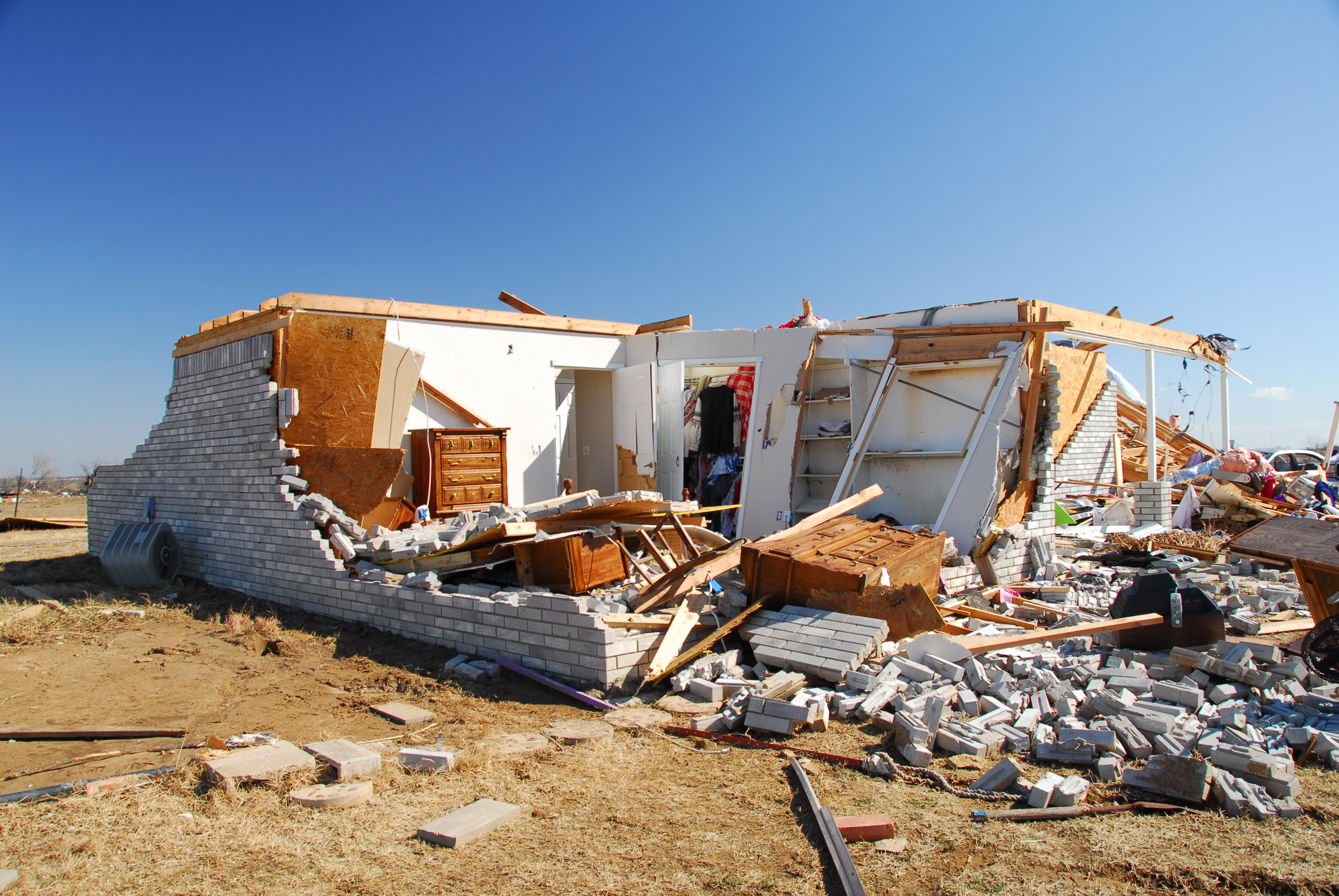
Significant damage to a home in Lone Grove

The tornado reached its maximum width of half a mile (0.80 km) and peak intensity of EF4 strength with winds of 170 mph (270 km/h) as it approached and struck the city of Lone Grove at around 7:25 p.m., where the tornado inflicted its worst damage. The tornado damaged and destroyed various homes, businesses and other buildings as it moved through the city, with some well-built residences sustaining EF4-level damage. Lone Grove's only furniture store was destroyed by the tornado. Many vehicles within the city were lofted and rolled. Numerous trees were damaged or toppled, with some being completely uprooted.

As the tornado continued moving through Lone Grove, it directly impacted the Bar K Mobile Home Park, destroying 37 of the 41 mobile homes within the park and killing six people. Several mobile homes within Lone Grove were reduced to unrecognizable pieces of debris. A seventh fatality occurred in the city when a well-constructed house was destroyed by the tornado at EF4 strength. At one point, the tornado tore a roof off a home and lifted a girl into the air, with her family managing to keep her from being carried away. As the tornado crossed Interstate 35, the eighth and final fatality occurred when a tractor-trailer driving south on the highway was toppled by the tornado's winds, killing the driver.

=== Impacts in the Majestic Hills neighborhood ===
Severe damage to the Ardmore Adventist Academy

The tornado continued northeastward, with a new tornado warning being issued for eastern portions of Carter County and for southern portions of Murray County. The tornado struck the Majestic Hills neighborhood just north of Ardmore at EF4 intensity, destroying at least eight well-built homes. The tornado then struck the nearby Ardmore Adventist Academy, a small private school, which sustained severe damage. Numerous walls collapsed and large portions of the roof were destroyed. The school's gymnasium was also damaged, and a pecan tree orchid on the property was flattened. The tornado then continued northeast before rapidly weakening and dissipating at 7:43 p.m., just past Deer Creek Road and to the east of Springer, Oklahoma.

== Aftermath ==
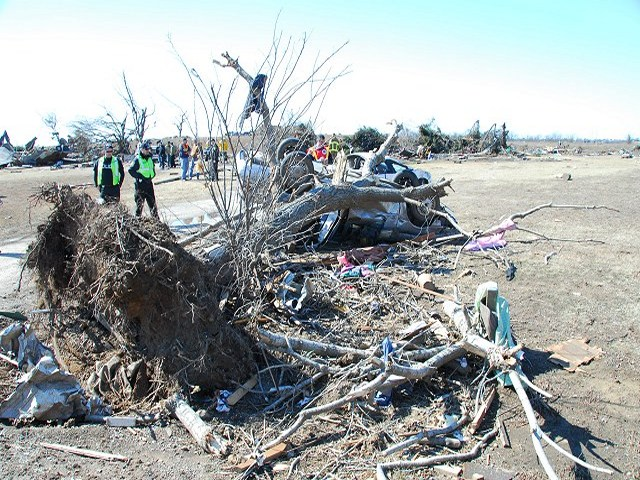
A tree that was completely uprooted

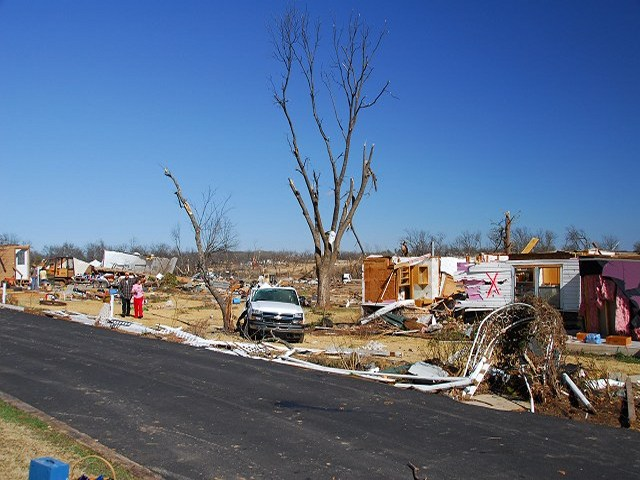
Widespread damage in Lone Grove

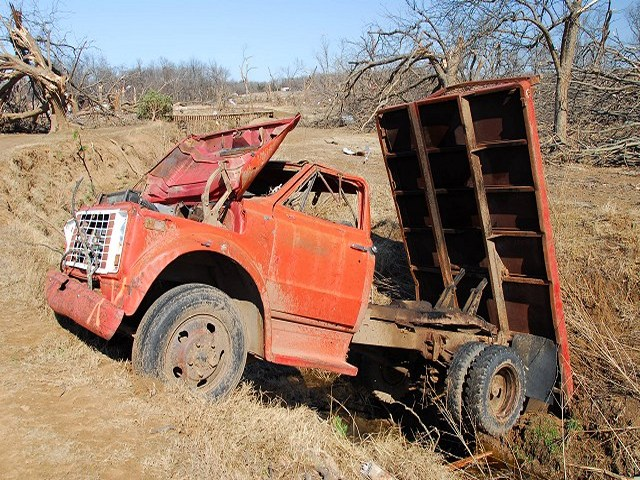
A truck that was damaged and moved into a ditch

=== Damage ===
The tornado caused widespread damage throughout Lone Grove and the Majestic Hills neighborhood, with at least 114 mobile homes and single-family residences being destroyed. The Ardmore Adventist Academy building was deemed a total loss, and classes were temporarily moved to a nearby church. Around 3,500 people lost electricity in the Carter County area. Numerous trees were destroyed and damaged, with some being completely uprooted. Various vehicles were lofted and rolled, with some being found a significant distance from their original locations. The only furniture store in Lone Grove was destroyed. Debris from this tornado were carried as far as Sulphur, Oklahoma. The tornado caused $3 million (2009 USD) in damages. (Note: All amounts of money are in 2009 USD unless stated otherwise.)

=== Recovery efforts ===
During the evening of February 10, national and local emergency services started rescue and recovery efforts, confirming the eight fatalities and 47 injuries. The emergency crews spray-painted an X on each building they searched before letting residents check for their belongings.

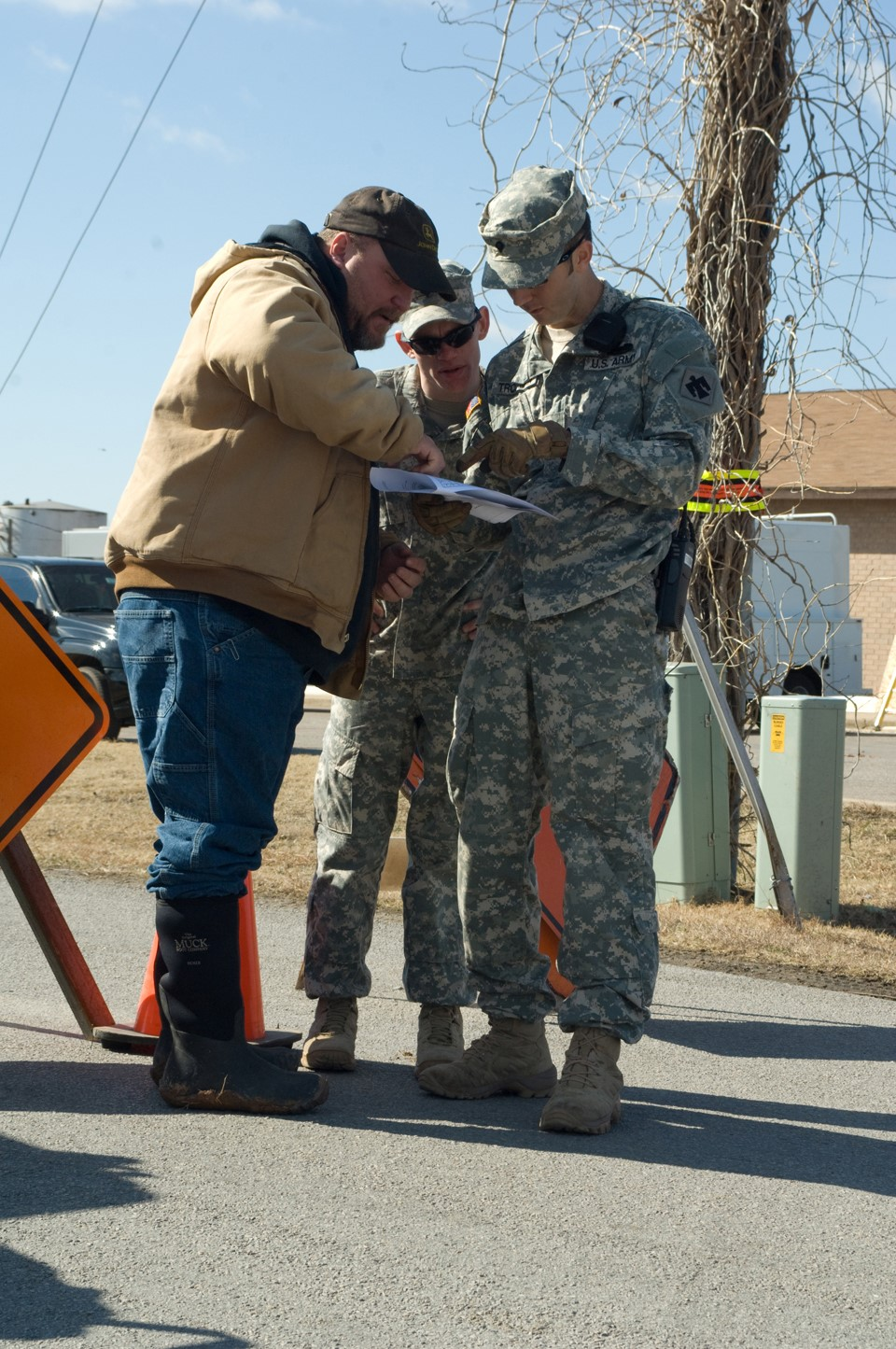
The National Guard in Lone Grove following the tornado

Oklahoma Governor Brad Henry visited the area and toured the damage on February 11, declaring a state of emergency in 17 counties. 28 members of the Oklahoma National Guard headed to Lone Grove after a briefing in Ardmore. The troops secured entry points near the hardest-hit areas, and aided local law enforcement. The Guardsmen were scheduled to be in the city until February 16. The American Red Cross opened shelters at Heritage Hall in Ardmore, Waterloo Baptist Church in Edmond, and Messiah Lutheran Church in Oklahoma City for those affected by the storms. The Salvation Army opened a canteen in Lone Grove to provide food and drinks, and by mid-day on February 12, they donated over 2,000 meals, beverages, and snacks. Baptist Disaster Relief provided aid to those in Lone Grove by distributing food and offering emotional support. The Department of Homeland Security offered to help rebuild damaged infrastructure and support those who lost their homes in the storm.

The Chickasaw Telephone Company and the First National Bank and Trust Company established a relief fund for those in Lone Grove, with both companies donating a substantial amount of money. Feed the Children sent two truckloads of essential goods to affected areas in Carter County, with one truck being deployed to Lone Grove and the other to Ardmore.

Around 7,000 tons of debris were within Lone Grove following the tornado, with an estimated cost of cleanup totaling around $500,000. Downed trees and branches were cut for firewood or turned into woodchips. FEMA approved Governor Brad Henry's request for assistance on February 25 and provided $90,000 in public assistance funds up front, and promised to provide an additional $90,000 if needed.

OEM and FEMA opened a recovery center in Lone Grove, allowing affected residents to receive information and fill out disaster loan applications. Those who were affected were allowed to borrow up to $200,000 to repair or replace their homes, and up to $40,000 to replace destroyed personal property. Businesses were allowed to borrow up to $2 million for property damage and economic loss. By February 23, federal grants topped $781,000, with 248 individuals applying for assistance and 140 home inspections being completed.

Members of the Chickasaw Nation aided in the cleanup of Lone Grove, with 13 members of the Tribal Lighthorse Police department assisting in the two-day search and recovery effort. Chickasaw Nation Facilities and the Support Division and Career Development Initiative program (CDI) helped tornado victims recover possessions and aided in cleaning up the area. The Chickasaw Nation Ardmore senior site provided shelter for storm victims. Donation drives and fundraisers were organized in the Chickasaw Nation for those impacted by the tornado.

On March 14, 2009, musical artist Chris Cagle, along with various other musicians, performed at a benefit concert and raised over $18,000 for those impacted by the tornado. Another concert that was performed by The Salvation Army raised over $2,300.

In the year following the tornado, the Bar K Mobile Home Park was renamed and new mobile homes were assembled, and the majority of Lone Grove residents who left the city had returned. Inhabitants of the Majestic Hills neighborhood had new homes constructed.

=== Warning and safety issues ===
Following the tornado, it was discovered that some residents were caught off-guard, despite the tornado sirens going off and a tornado warning being issued 37 minutes prior. The absence of storm cellars within the Bar K Mobile Home Park meant that the people living within the park had no safe place to shelter during the storm, as mobile homes are one of the most susceptible structures in high winds and severe weather. Oklahoma lawmakers discussed options in providing storm shelters to those in mobile home parks after John Bowman, the manager of the Lone Grove Mobile Community, appealed for action following the tornado, as a majority of the fatalities occurred when mobile homes were completely destroyed or overturned.

=== Public reaction ===
On February 12, President Barack Obama spoke with Governor Brad Henry and Oklahoma Senators Jim Inhofe and Tom Coburn, stating that he "passed along his condolences and best wishes to the victims".

The Lone Grove tornado memorial

The controversial Westboro Baptist Church made an announcement that members of the church were going to stage a demonstration in Ardmore on the Valentine's Day following the tornado. The church described the tornado as a divine punishment, and were reportedly planning to target funeral services in Ardmore.

A memorial service in honor of the victims was scheduled for 7:00 p.m. on February 10, 2010, exactly one year after the tornado.

On May 29, 2010, a stone memorial was installed at the Lone Grove Kiwanis Club to honor those who lost their lives and were impacted by the tornado, and to the individuals who assisted in rebuilding the community.

=== Casualties ===
This tornado became the deadliest and first EF4+ tornado to strike Oklahoma during the month of February, and was the deadliest tornado of 2009 in the United States. Eight people died as a result of the tornado, all within and around Lone Grove, and 46 people were injured, 14 of whom sustained severe injuries. Six of the eight fatalities occurred within mobile homes in the Bar K Mobile Home Park. A seventh person was killed after their well-built house sustained EF4 damage. Three bodies were found outside of their leveled mobile homes. Two other bodies were discovered inside the remains of their homes. One body was discovered on a road within the trailer park, and another was found in a nearby field. The eighth and final fatality was a truck driver whose vehicle was struck and toppled by the tornado while driving on Interstate 35. It was reported that a majority of the deaths were due to blunt-force trauma to the head.

List of tornado victims
Name	Age	Location
Susan "Gail" Fambrough	54	Lone Grove, Oklahoma
William Fambrough	48	Lone Grove, Oklahoma
Tim Nevill	36	Lone Grove, Oklahoma
Molly Hutchinson	53	Lone Grove, Oklahoma
Trevor Morgan	30	Lone Grove, Oklahoma
Donna McGarvey	54	Lone Grove, Oklahoma
William Wheat	78	Lone Grove, Oklahoma
Gary Boyd Jr.	39	Interstate 35

== In popular culture ==
On May 24, 2009, the tornado was highlighted in Season 2, Episode 19 of The Weather Channel's Storm Stories series, which featured footage of the aftermath and first-hand accounts from meteorologists, survivors, and emergency personnel.

== See also ==
- List of F4 and EF4 tornadoes (2000–2009)
- List of F4, EF4, and IF4 tornadoes
- 2008 Atkins–Clinton tornado, another violent and deadly EF4 tornado in Arkansas that occurred one year and five days earlier
