= Lone Grove, Oklahoma =

City in Oklahoma, US

- City
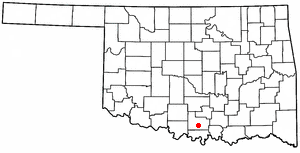
- Location of Lone Grove, Oklahoma
- Coordinates: 34°10′39″N 97°14′55″W
- Country: United States
- State: Oklahoma
- County: Carter

Area
  - Total: 24.91 sq mi (64.52 km^{2})
  - Land: 24.85 sq mi (64.35 km^{2})
  - Water: 0.066 sq mi (0.17 km^{2})
- Elevation: 942 ft (287 m)

Population (2020)
  - Total: 4,993
  - Density: 201/sq mi (77.6/km^{2})
- Time zone: UTC-6 (Central (CST))
  - Summer (DST): UTC-5 (CDT)
- ZIP code: 73443
- Area code: 580
- FIPS code: 40-43750
- GNIS feature ID: 2410861

Lone Grove is a city in Carter County, Oklahoma, United States. As of the 2020 census, Lone Grove had a population of 4,993. It is part of the Micropolitan Statistical Area of Ardmore.

The city, located 7 miles (11 km) west of Ardmore on U.S. Route 70, is a bedroom community, with many residents employed in Ardmore.

== History ==
Lone Grove is built on the site of a former village located in Pickens County, Chickasaw Nation in the Indian Territory, near a stand of cedar trees. The town was founded and a post office was established in Lone Grove on February 4, 1885. Prior to that the community was named "Price's Store", after local general mercantile owner T. C. "Tom Cat" Price. A fire destroyed many of the Lone Grove businesses and some homes in February 1899.

The city's population was reported at 215 in a 1905 geological survey of the territory. During the early 1900s local businesses included three grocery stores, a barbershop, a drugstore, a movie theater, a blacksmith shop, and three doctors. Numerous oil pools, including the Healdton and Hewitt fields, were discovered nearby during the 1910s and 1920s, and the Oklahoma, New Mexico and Pacific Railway reached town in 1913. (Popularly called the Ringling Railroad for financial backer John Nicholas Ringling, the line was later acquired by the Atchison, Topeka and Santa Fe Railway and was abandoned in 1976.) During the 1920s, the community grew with the addition of a two-story Masonic Lodge building, a wagonyard, a restaurant, a grist mill, a cleaning and press shop, and an automobile garage and gasoline filling station.

=== 2009 tornado ===
On February 10, 2009, a tornado killed eight people in Lone Grove. The National Weather Service rated the tornado EF4 with peak winds in excess of 165 miles per hour (266 km/h). According to the Lone Grove city manager 114 mobile homes were destroyed, and 46 people were injured.

The tornado occurred at 7:30 p.m. (CST) killing 8 and leaving 14 seriously injured. Seven were killed in Lone Grove, and the other was a truck driver passing through the area. Although tornadoes are not new to the area, they are very unusual in February, and many residents were caught off guard, despite the tornado sirens. According to the National Weather Service since 1950, the state has been struck by 44 tornadoes in the month of February.

== Geography ==
Lone Grove is located south of the geographic center of Carter County. U.S. Highway 70 runs through the center of town, leading east 7 miles (11 km) to Ardmore, the county seat, and west 43 miles (69 km) to Waurika.

According to the United States Census Bureau, the city has a total area of 27.6 square miles (71.4 km^{2}), of which 27.5 square miles (71.2 km^{2}) is land and 0.08 square miles (0.2 km^{2}), or 0.31%, is water.

== Demographics ==
Historical population
Census	Pop.	Note	%±
1900	215		—
1910	222		3.3%
1970	1,240		—
1980	3,369		171.7%
1990	4,114		22.1%
2000	4,631		12.6%
2010	5,054		9.1%
2020	4,993		−1.2%
U.S. Decennial Census

=== 2020 census ===
As of the 2020 census, Lone Grove had a population of 4,993. The median age was 37.8 years. 26.8% of residents were under the age of 18 and 16.3% of residents were 65 years of age or older. For every 100 females there were 100.0 males, and for every 100 females age 18 and over there were 98.6 males age 18 and over.

0% of residents lived in urban areas, while 100.0% lived in rural areas.

There were 1,852 households in Lone Grove, of which 38.2% had children under the age of 18 living in them. Of all households, 54.6% were married-couple households, 18.3% were households with a male householder and no spouse or partner present, and 21.8% were households with a female householder and no spouse or partner present. About 21.7% of all households were made up of individuals and 8.3% had someone living alone who was 65 years of age or older.

There were 1,990 housing units, of which 6.9% were vacant. Among occupied housing units, 75.6% were owner-occupied and 24.4% were renter-occupied. The homeowner vacancy rate was 0.1% and the rental vacancy rate was 8.9%.

Racial composition as of the 2020 census
Race	Percent
White	71.5%
Black or African American	2.0%
American Indian and Alaska Native	10.9%
Asian	0.4%
Native Hawaiian and Other Pacific Islander	<0.1%
Some other race	2.9%
Two or more races	12.3%
Hispanic or Latino (of any race)	5.9%

=== 2000 census ===
As of the census of 2000, there were 4,631 people, 1,673 households, and 1,345 families residing in the city. The population density was 165.0 inhabitants per square mile (63.7/km^{2}). There were 1,873 housing units at an average density of 66.7 per square mile (25.8/km^{2}). The racial makeup of the city was 84.50% White, 1.86% African American, 7.90% Native American, 0.15% Asian, 0.11% Pacific Islander, 0.52% from other races, and 4.97% from two or more races. Hispanic or Latino of any race were 1.97% of the population.

There were 1,673 households, out of which 43.8% had children under the age of 18 living with them, 65.2% were married couples living together, 11.6% had a female householder with no husband present, and 19.6% were non-families. 17.0% of all households were made up of individuals, and 6.0% had someone living alone who was 65 years of age or older. The average household size was 2.76 and the average family size was 3.11.

In the city, the population was spread out, with 30.9% under the age of 18, 8.4% from 18 to 24, 30.2% from 25 to 44, 21.6% from 45 to 64, and 8.9% who were 65 years of age or older. The median age was 33 years. For every 100 females, there were 100.5 males. For every 100 females age 18 and over, there were 93.6 males.

The median income for a household in the city was $31,846, and the median income for a family was $38,800. Males had a median income of $30,365 versus $17,598 for females. The per capita income for the city was $13,125. About 14.0% of families and 15.0% of the population were below the poverty line, including 18.0% of those under age 18 and 18.8% of those age 65 or over.
