= Tropical Storm Kim (1983) =

Pacific tropical storm in 1983

Tropical Storm Kim (Rosing)
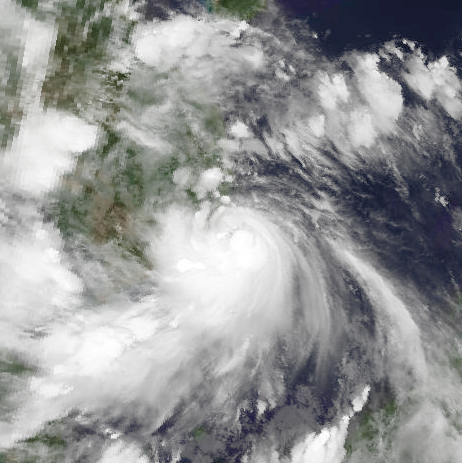
- Kim at peak intensity on October 16

Meteorological history
- Formed: October 14, 1983
- Dissipated: October 18, 1983

Tropical storm
- 10-minute sustained (JMA)
- Highest winds: 75 km/h (45 mph)
- Lowest pressure: 994 hPa (mbar); 29.35 inHg

Tropical storm
- 1-minute sustained (SSHWS/JTWC)
- Highest winds: 75 km/h (45 mph)

Overall effects
- Fatalities: 300 reported
- Damage: $26 million (including Herbert)
- Areas affected: Philippines; Thailand; Vietnam; Cambodia; Bangladesh
- IBTrACS
- Part of the 1983 Pacific typhoon season

Tropical Storm Kim, known in the Philippines as Tropical Depression Rosing, was the only storm in 1983 to move from the Western Pacific basin into the North Indian Ocean basin. Kim originated as a weak tropical disturbance that formed to the northeast of Truk during the second week of October. It drifted westward over the subsequent days, and on October 15, while located over the South China Sea, the disturbance was classified as a tropical depression. Late the following day, the system was briefly upgraded into a tropical storm, but the storm dissipated quickly after making landfall in Vietnam early on October 17. After trekking across Indochina, the remnants of Kim moved into the Andaman Sea and re-developed into a tropical cyclone on October 19, according to the Joint Typhoon Warning Center (JTWC). However, Kim dissipated for good the next day while located inland over Burma.

Tropical Storm Kim contributed to the worst monsoon rains in Thailand in 30 years. Sixteen of Thailand's 73 provinces were inundated due to the storm. In the capital of Bangkok, almost every street and alley sustained flooding, stranding motorists. Throughout the country, a total of 190 bridges and at least 1,000 roads were damaged. The tropical storm also destroyed 300 boats, 3,000 houses, and 19,750 acres (8,000 ha) of rice. Damage from both Kim and Tropical Storm Herbert, which affected the same areas as Kim a few weeks earlier, totaled $26 million (1983 USD). Due to Kim alone, over 200 people died in Thailand, and an additional 100 were killed due to widespread flooding in Bangladesh.

== Meteorological history ==
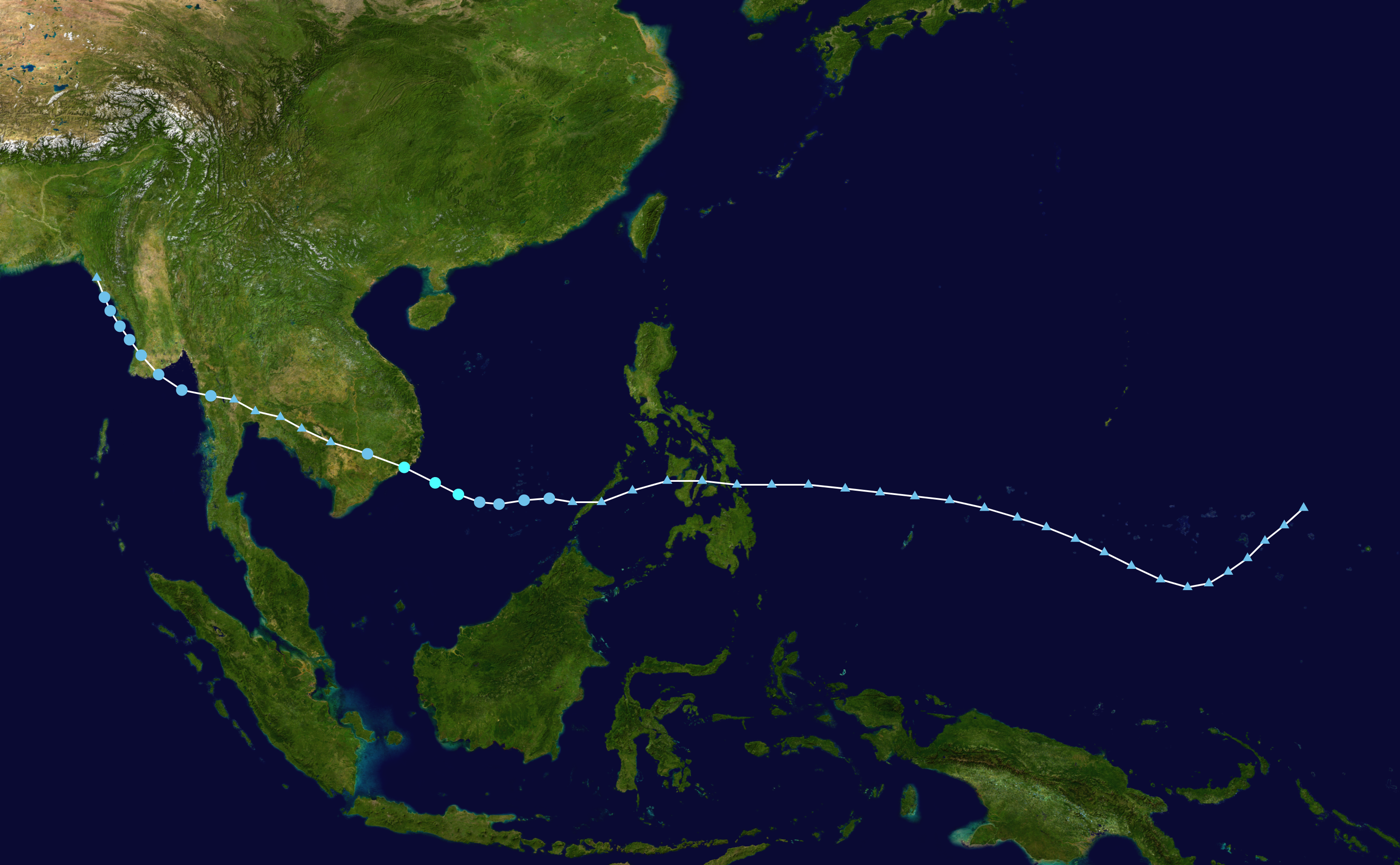
Map plotting the storm's track and intensity, according to the Saffir–Simpson scale Map key Saffir–Simpson scale Tropical depression (≤38 mph, ≤62 km/h) Tropical storm (39–73 mph, 63–118 km/h) Category 1 (74–95 mph, 119–153 km/h) Category 2 (96–110 mph, 154–177 km/h) Category 3 (111–129 mph, 178–208 km/h) Category 4 (130–156 mph, 209–251 km/h) Category 5 (≥157 mph, ≥252 km/h) Unknown Storm type Tropical cyclone Subtropical cyclone Extratropical cyclone, remnant low, tropical disturbance, or monsoon depression

Tropical Storm Kim originated from a weak tropical disturbance that formed to the northeast of Truk on October 9. Over the next few days, the disturbance persisted while moving west; however, the Joint Typhoon Warning Center (JTWC) initially expected the disturbance to dissipate over the southern Philippines without further development. On October 14, the disturbance became less organized over the Sulu Sea, only to move into the South China Sea the next day, where the disturbance was upgraded into a tropical depression by the JTWC. By this time, the monsoon trough was well developed in the South China Sea and provided a favorable environment aloft for further development. At 18:00 UTC on October 15, the Japan Meteorological Agency (JMA) started monitoring the system. (Note: The Japan Meteorological Agency is the official Regional Specialized Meteorological Center for the western Pacific Ocean.) (Note: Wind estimates from the JMA and most other basins throughout the world are sustained over 10 minutes, while estimates from the United States-based Joint Typhoon Warning Center are sustained over 1 minute. 10 minute winds are about 1.14 times the amount of 1 minute winds.)

Early on October 16, a Tropical Cyclone Formation Alert (TCFA) was issued, and at midday, the JTWC reported that the system attained tropical storm status. Later on October 16, the JMA upgraded Kim into a tropical storm, with winds of 75 km/h (45 mph), its peak intensity. Five hours later, the JTWC reported that Kim made landfall on the coast of Vietnam at its peak intensity of 75 km/h (45 mph). Operationally, the JTWC stopped issuing advisories early the next day after Kim's atmospheric circulation became less defined, though intensity estimates from the JMA suggested that Kim maintained tropical storm intensity during this time. Following a decrease in organization, the JMA ceased tracking the system on October 18.

The remnants of Kim moved into Cambodia and then across the rest of Indochina while producing a large amount of convection. Under the anticipation of regeneration in the Andaman Sea, a TCFA was again issued by the JTWC during the afternoon hours on October 18. Early the next day, the JTWC classified Kim as a tropical depression. Initially, the regenerated depression was expected to move across the southern tip of Burma and intensify further in the Bay of Bengal. Even though Kim moved across southern Burma as expected, it never moved into the Bay of Bengal. Instead, it drifted northwards along the coast of Burma, parallel to the Arakan Mountain Range and gradually weakened. The JTWC issued their last warning on Kim at 18:00 UTC on October 20 while located over the Arakan Mountains.

== Impact ==
Despite its weak intensity, Kim's rapid development left many unprepared for the storm, which brought flooding to much of Thailand, which were already suffering the effects of Tropical Storm Herbert a few weeks earlier. Sixteen of Thailand's 73 provinces were flooded, with the Prachinburi province suffering the worst impacts from the flooding, where seven people drowned. The capital city of Bangkok, which at that time had a population of 6 million, was devastated and virtually every street and alley was flooded. Many commuters were stranded on the roofs of their cars, and were forced to walk through waist-deep water to reach safety. In addition, several airline flights in and out of the city were delayed or canceled. The road that connected the city's airport was flooded, resulting in hundreds of cars abandoned. During the first two weeks of October, 400 mm (15.7 in) of rain fell in Bangkok–the most rainfall recorded in that time frame in thirty years–much of the rain accumulating during the two weeks was due to Kim. Elsewhere, more than 510,000 acres (206,390 ha) of farmland were submerged in the central and northeastern part of the country. A total of 190 bridges and at least 1,000 roads were damaged. In all, 844 houses and 76,533 fishing ponds were damaged, while the tropical storm also destroyed or severely damaged 1,344 roads, 242 bridges, and 240 irrigation ditches. An additional 300 boats, 3,000 houses, and 19,750 acres (8,000 ha) of rice were destroyed.

Nationwide, damage from both Kim and Herbert totaled $26 million. Due to Kim alone, over 200 people were killed, including four that were electrocuted and "several" children that drowned due to flash flooding. Tropical Storm Kim contributed the worst monsoon season in Thailand in 30 years, which continued for four months after the storm. Elsewhere, remnants of the storm was responsible for flooding in Bangladesh, killing 100.

== See also ==
- Tropical Storm Podul (2013)
- Tropical Storm Chanthu (2004)
- Tropical Depression Wilma (2013)
