= Typhoon Tembin =

Pacific typhoon in 2017

Typhoon Tembin (Vinta)
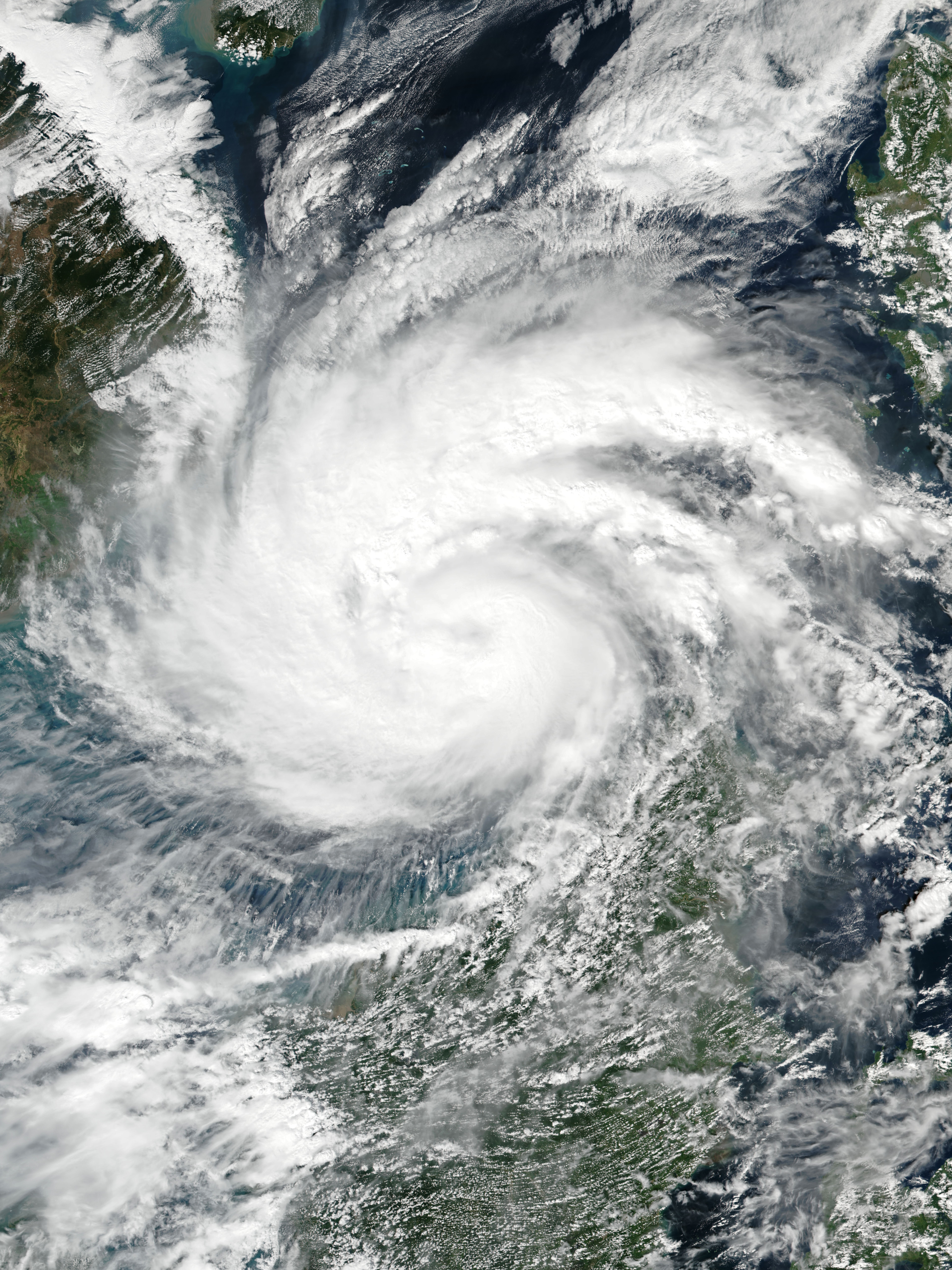
- Tembin at peak intensity in the South China Sea on December 24

Meteorological history
- Formed: December 20, 2017
- Dissipated: December 26, 2017

Typhoon
- 10-minute sustained (JMA)
- Highest winds: 130 km/h (80 mph)
- Lowest pressure: 970 hPa (mbar); 28.64 inHg

Category 2-equivalent typhoon
- 1-minute sustained (SSHWS/JTWC)
- Highest winds: 155 km/h (100 mph)
- Lowest pressure: 959 hPa (mbar); 28.32 inHg

Overall effects
- Fatalities: 266 total
- Damage: $42 million (2017 USD)
- Areas affected: Palau, Philippines, Malaysia, Vietnam
- IBTrACS
- Part of the 2017 Pacific typhoon season

Typhoon Tembin, known in the Philippines as Typhoon Vinta, was the deadliest tropical cyclone to strike Mindanao since Typhoon Bopha in 2012. Following and impacting the Philippines less than a few days after the deadly Tropical Storm Kai-tak, Tembin is the twenty-seventh named storm and the eleventh typhoon of the 2017 Pacific typhoon season. It was first classified as a weak tropical depression on December 16. The system gradually intensified and consolidated into a tropical storm on December 20. Tembin made landfall in Mindanao late the next day. On December 23, Tembin followed a path towards the South China Sea and intensified into a typhoon early the following day. Quick intensification ensued and Tembin reached its peak intensity as a low-end Category 2 typhoon as assessed by the Joint Typhoon Warning Center on December 24. Unfavorable conditions enhanced by the winter monsoon caused Tembin to rapidly weaken shortly afterwards, before it ultimately dissipated on December 26 while just south of Vietnam.

Tembin caused a total of 266 deaths, five of which were from a sinking of a ferry due to rough seas caused by the storm.

== Meteorological history ==
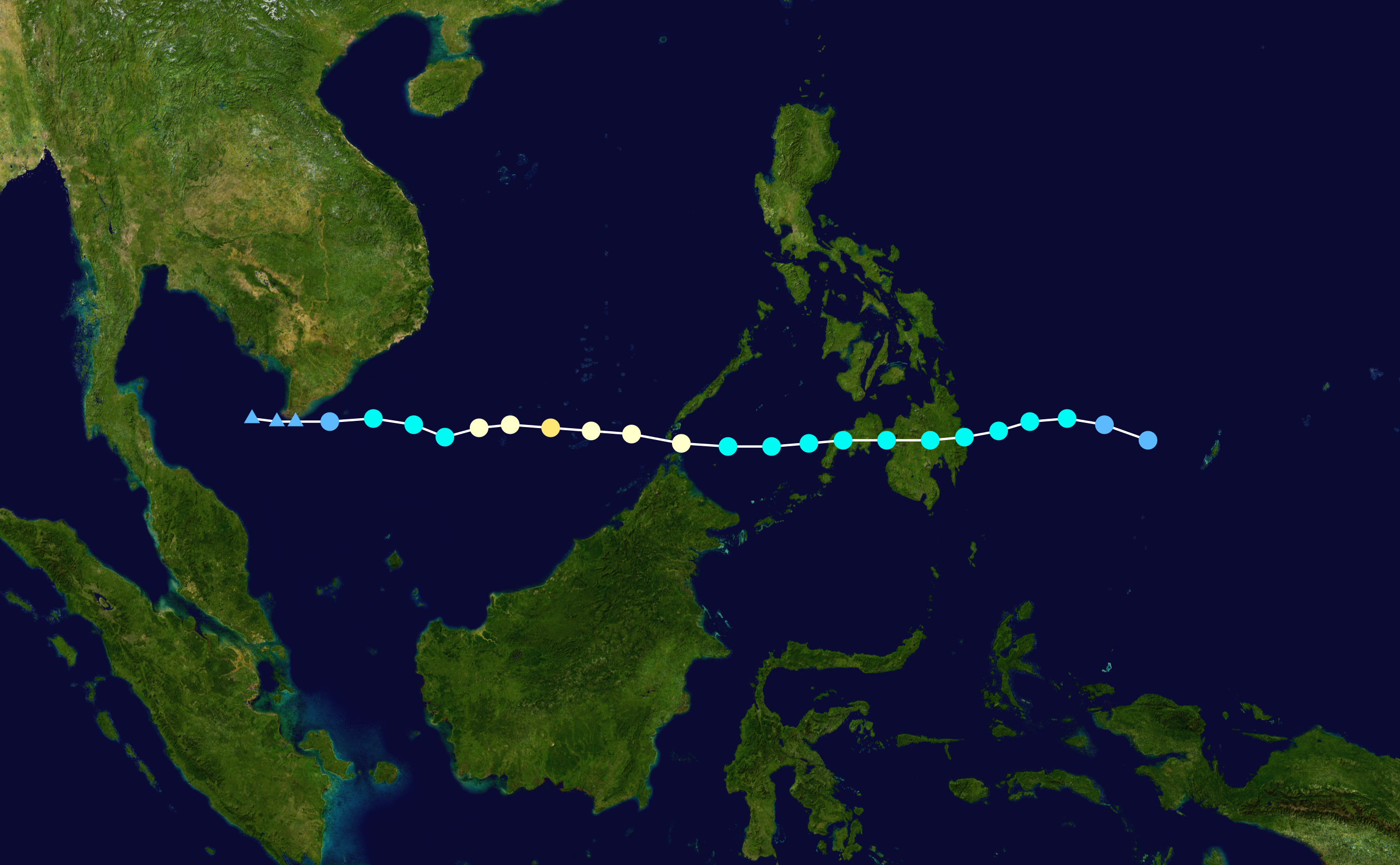
Map plotting the storm's track and intensity, according to the Saffir–Simpson scale Map key Saffir–Simpson scale Tropical depression (≤38 mph, ≤62 km/h) Tropical storm (39–73 mph, 63–118 km/h) Category 1 (74–95 mph, 119–153 km/h) Category 2 (96–110 mph, 154–177 km/h) Category 3 (111–129 mph, 178–208 km/h) Category 4 (130–156 mph, 209–251 km/h) Category 5 (≥157 mph, ≥252 km/h) Unknown Storm type Tropical cyclone Subtropical cyclone Extratropical cyclone, remnant low, tropical disturbance, or monsoon depression

On December 14, the United States Joint Typhoon Warning Center (JTWC) started to publicly monitor a tropical disturbance that had developed about 620 km (385 mi) to the south-southeast of Chuuk State. At this time, the disturbance had a broad low-level circulation center, while atmospheric convection surrounding the system was poorly organized. Over the next couple of days, the disturbance gradually developed further as it moved west-northwestwards within an area of favorable conditions for further development, including low vertical wind shear and warm sea surface temperatures of 30–31 °C (86–88 °F). On December 16, the Japan Meteorological Agency (JMA) classified the disturbance as a weak tropical depression, however they reclassified it as an area of low pressure during the following day.

On December 20, the JMA reclassified the system as a tropical depression, after atmospheric convection had started to wrap into the low-level circulation center (LLCC). By this time the system was located about 85 km (55 mi) to the northwest of Melekeok, Palau, and moving northwestwards along the subtropical ridge towards Mindanao in the Philippines. Later the same day, the JTWC and PAGASA also classified the system as a tropical depression with the latter naming it as Vinta. Not long after, the JMA upgraded the system to a tropical storm and named it Tembin. (Note: The name Tembin (Japanese: テンビン, [tẽ̞mbʲĩn]) was contributed by Japan and refers to the constellation Libra, the balancing scale, in Japanese.)

On December 21, satellite imagery revealed formative banding wrapping around Tembin's LLCC amid an environment of low to moderate vertical wind shear and warm waters of 29 °C (84 °F). Noting this increase in organization, the JTWC upgraded the system to a tropical storm as well. By 12:00 UTC, the JMA found that Tembin had intensified further to a severe tropical storm. Three hours later, the JTWC reported 1-minute sustained winds had increased to 75 km/h (45 mph). Later, the PAGASA announced that Tembin made landfall in Cateel, Davao Oriental around 17:45 UTC. Within the JTWC's next advisory on 21:00 UTC, they mentioned that feeder bands was wrapping in a central dense overcast feature that was obscuring its LLCC. While Tembin traversed Mindanao, convection warmed and the storm slightly weakened, and the JMA downgraded the system back to a tropical storm at 03:00 UTC on December 22. However, Tembin strengthened back into a severe tropical storm several hours later, just after making its second landfall near Balabac, Palawan. Following the course of Severe Tropical Storm Linda, impact in Vietnam and the Mekong Delta was presumed. As a weak late-season tropical cyclone, Tembin dissipated near Cape Cà Mau on December 26.

== Preparations and impact ==
=== Philippines ===
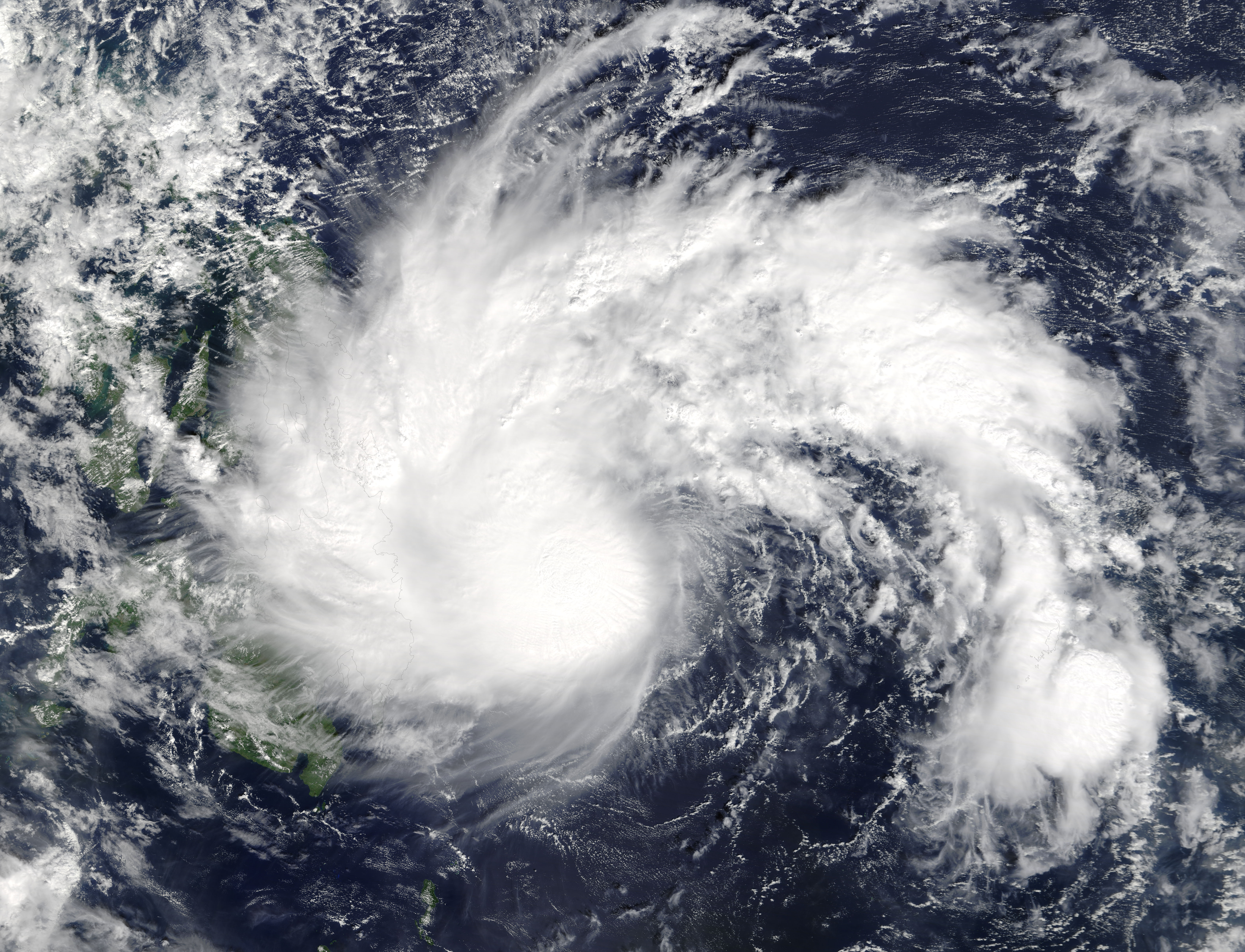
Tropical Storm Tembin approaching the Philippines on December 21

Deaths from Tropical Storm Vinta (Tembin)
Province	Fatalities	Ref
Bukidnon	6	
Davao Region	4	
Iligan	1	
Lanao del Norte	135	
Lanao del Sur	27	
Misamis Occidental	1	
Palawan	9	
Quezon	5	
Zamboanga del Norte	78	
Totals:	266	

During December 20, as PAGASA issued its first advisory on the system, Public Storm Warning Signal No. 1 was raised over Surigao del Sur and the northern portion of Davao Oriental Province. Mayor Sara Duterte announced the suspension of classes for all school levels in Davao City, from December 21–23, and other provinces followed suit. It was forecast that the storm would bring gusty winds ranging from 95 to 140 km/h (59 to 87 mph) over Mindanao, and both Palawan and northern Sabah were warned to have an estimated rainfall of 125–500 mm (4.9–19.7 in), increasing the risk of mudslides and flash floods. As the storm moved closer, PAGASA subsequently listed more provinces under Signal #1, such as the Compostela Valley, Agusan del Norte and Agusan del Sur. Widespread rains were expected over in the areas of eastern Mindanao and Eastern Visayas.

On December 22, 30 flights were canceled at Mactan–Cebu International Airport as Tembin (Vinta) intensified into a tropical storm. About 200 passengers were affected from the canceled flights and were seen staying in the airport. Ninoy Aquino International Airport had also canceled a total of 21 flights directed towards either Visayas or Mindanao. The Cebu City Disaster Risk Reduction Management Office (CCDRMO) also advised the public to delay their trips to the south and let the storm pass through before leaving their homes. About 28 vessels were not allowed to sail in some Cebu ports, which were bound for Bohol, Negros Occidental, Leyte and Mindanao, despite the area was not listed under a storm signal warning. This resulted in 1,531 passengers stranded in various ports, including 115 rolling cargoes. Ferry services were also suspended in Samal Island and much of Davao as PAGASA raised Davao del Norte to a Public Storm Signal Warning No. 2.

In Compostela Valley, about 1,709 people were evacuated due to possible landslides and storm surge while some towns in Davao Oriental had 5,000 individuals evacuated. The mayor of Lupon announced the suspension of work on December 22, and ordered the prepositioning of relief goods, rescue teams and equipment. A fire broke out in the town of Banaybanay due to heavy rains on 18:00 UTC of December 22. Three bridges were closed due to rising water levels in Cagayan de Oro, where 1,719 individuals were forced to evacuate. Roughly 30,000 people were either stranded in ports or stayed in evacuation centers while 22,000 people moved to higher ground due to flooding. After the storm, on December 25, two towns in Zamboanga del Norte were under a state of calamity because of the flooding caused by the storm, which also made several roads and bridges impassible as they were covered in mud.

According to the International Federation of Red Cross and Red Crescent Societies, about 70,000 people were either displaced or affected by the storm. Rough seas were observed off Quezon Province, which resulted in an accident where a ferry carrying about 250 passengers sank off Infanta, killing five people. A total of 252 fatalities were reported in the archipelago of Mindanao, of which 135 were reported in the province of Lanao del Norte. Estimated damages reached around ₱2.1 billion (US$42 million).

=== Vietnam ===
On December 24, Vietnamese Prime Minister Nguyễn Xuân Phúc instructed the southern provinces to focus on preparing for the coming storm. Initially, approximately 650,000 people evacuated, of which most hailed from the southern provinces. Many provinces instructed all students and workers to stay at home except for disaster response personnel. The province of Quảng Ngãi was forecast to experience heavy downpours with the Mekong Delta having about 150 mm (5.9 in) of rain while Ho Chi Minh City was expected to experience 10 cm (3.9 in) of rain from December 25–26. Some provinces near shorelines like Cà Mau and Bình Thuận banned fishing vessels to go out in sea from 09:00 UTC of December 23, though only 743 vessels docked to safe ports by December 27. Bà Rịa–Vũng Tàu province had only came up with two evacuation plans for 36,752 individuals.

Some flights and ships were canceled and resulted in over 4,000 visitors, including nearly 2,200 foreigners being stranded on Phú Quốc. The number of evacuees increased further to roughly 1 million individuals by December 26.

== Aftermath ==
Following the devastation of Tembin (Vinta), Davao City was declared in a state of calamity on December 25. The local government also helped release ₱83.4 million (US$1.67 million) of calamity fund to aid in its residents’ relief goods, medical, and financial needs. On December 27, another state of calamity was raised in the island of Palawan after the storm had caused extensive damages in many towns, especially in one barangay where 80% of infrastructure was damaged and nearly 200 homes flattened. The government also provided ₱12 million (US$248,000) worth of aid to the victims. A spokesperson from the NDRRMC had stated that the unusual high death toll was "unacceptable" although the government had properly provided information and prepared early for the storm.

=== Retirement ===
The PAGASA announced that the name Vinta had been retired from their naming lists after causing more than ₱1 billion worth of damages and it will never be used again as a typhoon name within the Philippine Area of Responsibility (PAR). In January 2018, it was replaced with Verbena for the 2021 season. However, due to the limited number of tropical cyclones that entered PAR, the name wasn’t used and instead was first used in the 2025 season.

Due to the damage and high death toll in Mindanao, the name Tembin was officially retired during the 50th annual session of the ESCAP/WMO Typhoon Committee in February 2018. In February 2019, it was replaced with the name Koinu, which was used for the first time in the 2023 season.

== See also ==
- Weather of 2017
- Tropical cyclones in 2017
- Tropical Storm Linda (1997) – one of the deadliest tropical cyclones to hit Vietnam, also took a similar track
- Tropical Storm Washi (Sendong; 2011) – late-season tropical storm that caused high loss of life to northern Mindanao in 2011
- Typhoon Bopha (Pablo; 2012) – strongest typhoon to make landfall in Mindanao.
- Tropical Storm Podul (Zoraida; 2013) – affected similar areas in Mindanao a few days after the exceptionally devastating Typhoon Haiyan
- Tropical Storm Jangmi (Seniang; 2014) – dropped extensive rainfall to much of Visayas and Mindanao between 2014 and 2015
- Tropical Storm Kai-tak (Urduja; 2017) – caused widespread flooding days before Tembin
