= Tropical Storm Linda (1997) =

Pacific severe tropical storm and North Indian cyclone in 1997

Severe Tropical Storm Linda (Openg)
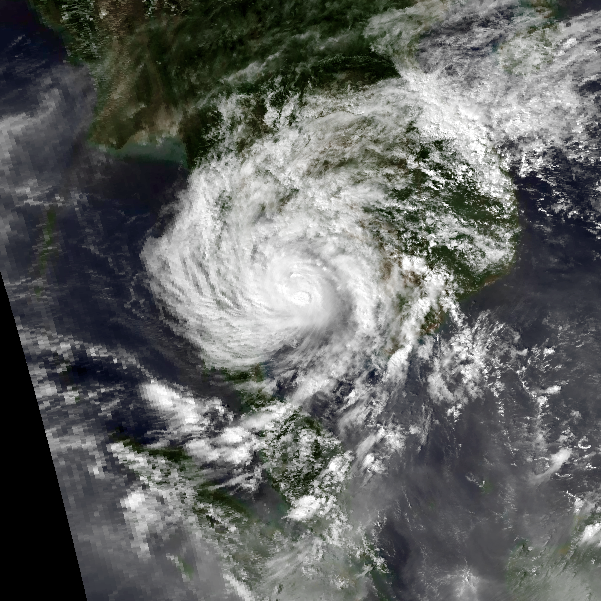
- Linda at peak intensity nearing the Malay Peninsula on November 3

Meteorological history
- Formed: October 31, 1997
- Dissipated: November 9, 1997

Severe tropical storm
- 10-minute sustained (JMA)
- Highest winds: 95 km/h (60 mph)
- Lowest pressure: 985 hPa (mbar); 29.09 inHg

Cyclonic storm
- 3-minute sustained (IMD)
- Highest winds: 65 km/h (40 mph)

Category 1-equivalent typhoon
- 1-minute sustained (SSHWS/JTWC)
- Highest winds: 120 km/h (75 mph)
- Lowest pressure: 976 hPa (mbar); 28.82 inHg

Overall effects
- Fatalities: 3,275 total
- Damage: $385 million
- Areas affected: Philippines, Malaysia, Indonesia, Brunei, Vietnam, Cambodia, Thailand, Burma
- IBTrACS
- Part of the 1997 Pacific typhoon and North Indian Ocean cyclone seasons

Severe Tropical Storm Linda, also known as Typhoon Linda, Cyclonic Storm Linda (BOB 08), or in the Philippines as Tropical Depression Openg, and in Vietnam as Typhoon No. 5 of 1997 (Vietnamese: Bão số 5 năm 1997) was the worst typhoon in southern Vietnam in at least 100 years, killing thousands of people and leaving extensive damage. It formed on October 31, 1997, in the South China Sea, between Indochina and the Philippines. Strengthening as it moved westward, Linda struck extreme southern Vietnam on November 2 with winds of 65 mph (105 km/h), dropping heavy rainfall. Once in the Gulf of Thailand it strengthened further to minimal typhoon status, but weakened to tropical storm strength before crossing the Malay Peninsula into the Bay of Bengal, the first storm to do so in five years. It restrengthened in the Indian Ocean to typhoon status, but increasing wind shear and weakened steering currents caused Linda to dissipate on November 9.

The worst of Linda's impact was in Vietnam, where 3,111 people were killed, and damage totaled 385 million (USD). Heavy rainfall caused flooding, which damaged or destroyed about 200,000 houses and left about 383,000 people homeless. Widespread crop and transportation damage also occurred, the latter which impeded relief efforts. Several countries around the world sent relief aid, including medical teams, food, and clothing. However, the food supply and health status of the storm victims proved not as bad as originally feared. Linda later struck Thailand, causing flash flooding and at least 164 deaths. The storm also affected Burma (Myanmar), Indonesia, Malaysia, and Cambodia to a lesser degree.

== Meteorological history ==
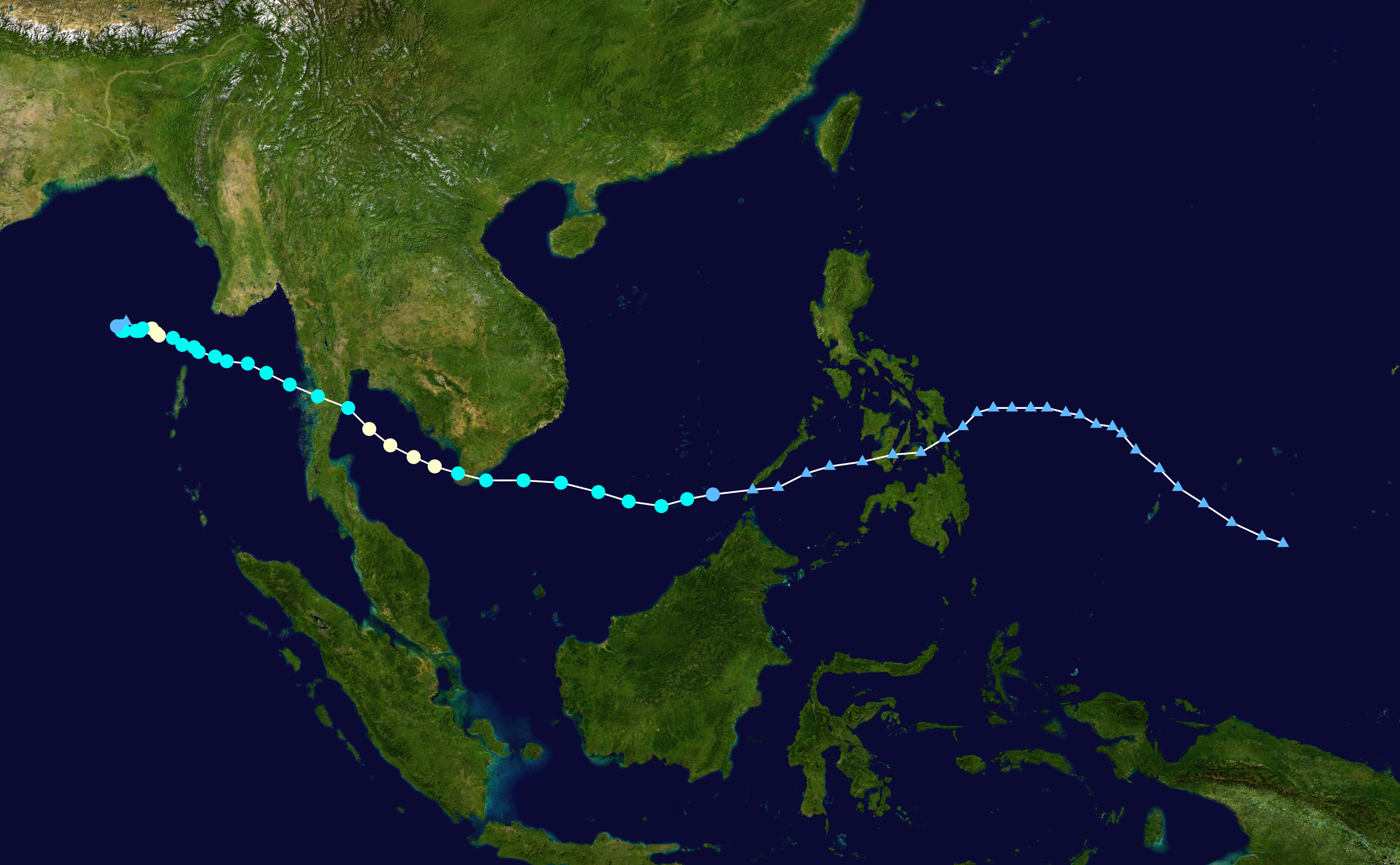
Map plotting the storm's track and intensity, according to the Saffir–Simpson scale Map key Saffir–Simpson scale Tropical depression (≤38 mph, ≤62 km/h) Tropical storm (39–73 mph, 63–118 km/h) Category 1 (74–95 mph, 119–153 km/h) Category 2 (96–110 mph, 154–177 km/h) Category 3 (111–129 mph, 178–208 km/h) Category 4 (130–156 mph, 209–251 km/h) Category 5 (≥157 mph, ≥252 km/h) Unknown Storm type Tropical cyclone Subtropical cyclone Extratropical cyclone, remnant low, tropical disturbance, or monsoon depression

The origins of Typhoon Linda were from an area of convection that were first noted east of the Philippines on October 26. A subtropical ridge persisted to the north, which caused the disturbance to move generally westward. On October 29, the system crossed the Philippines and entered the South China Sea. It subsequently began to organize, and late on October 31, the Joint Typhoon Warning Center (JTWC) initiated advisories on Tropical Depression 30W. At that time, the system was located off the northwest coast of Borneo. The PAGASA organization named it "Openg".

Shortly after developing, the depression intensified into a tropical storm, and was named "Linda" by the JTWC. It continued to intensify, reaching winds of 65 mph (105 km/h) as it approached southern Vietnam. At 0900 UTC on November 2, Linda made landfall in the Vietnamese province of Cà Mau. It maintained its strength over land, and the storm quickly reached typhoon status after entering the Gulf of Thailand; a typhoon is a tropical cyclone with winds of at least 75 mph (121 km/h), although Linda did not intensify beyond minimal typhoon status. Turning northwestward, Linda deteriorated to tropical storm strength, and struck Thailand late on November 3 with winds of 65 mph (105 km/h).

Linda weakened further over the mountainous terrain of the Malay Peninsula, and the storm emerged into the Andaman Sea with winds of 50 mph (80 km/h). This made Linda the first tropical cyclone since Tropical Storm Forrest in 1992 to cross from the western Pacific Ocean into the Indian Ocean. Additionally, upon reaching the Indian Ocean, the India Meteorological Department (IMD) classified the storm as Cyclonic Storm BOB 08, with winds of 40 mph (64 km/h). With warm waters, Tropical Storm Linda gradually re-intensified as it slowed down, due to a weakness in the subtropical ridge. On November 6, it again attained typhoon status while located off the southwest coast of Burma (Myanmar). Initially, it was expected to cross the Bay of Bengal and make landfall near the India/Bangladesh border. The cyclone only maintained peak strength for 18 hours, due to an increase in wind shear from a mid-latitude trough. Linda's motion became nearly stationary, and it gradually weakened for several days. On November 9, Linda dissipated about 375 miles (604 km) southwest of Yangon, Burma. That day, the IMD also terminated advisories.

== Impact and aftermath ==
Deaths by country
| Vietnam | 3,111 |
| Thailand | 164 |
| Total | 3,275 |

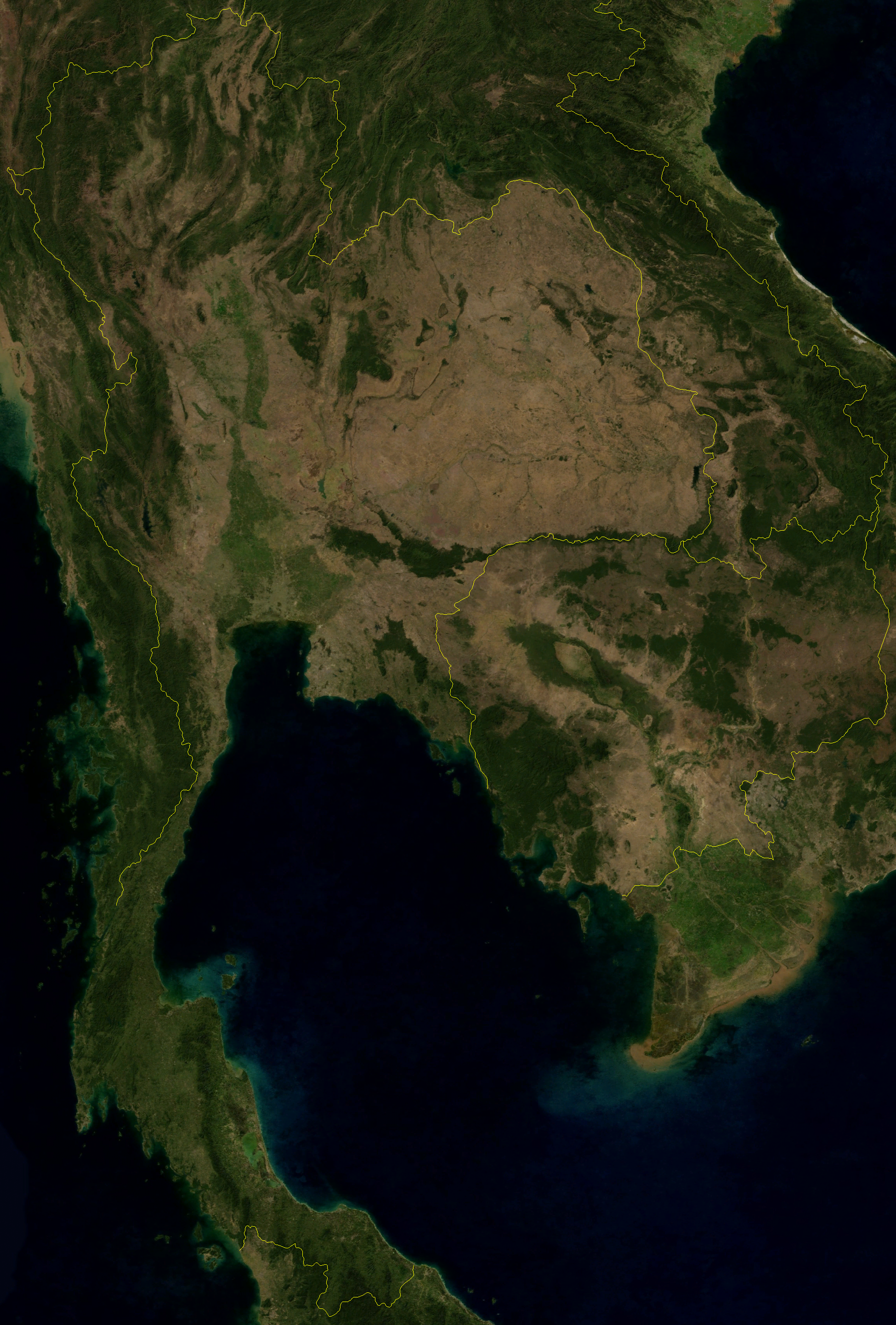
Satellite image of broader Indochina, including Vietnam on the right and Thailand to the left

Prior to the arrival of the storm, officials in Vietnam issued warnings to the residents, although its approach was faster than expected, and the region rarely experiences tropical cyclones. Tropical Storm Linda dropped heavy rainfall across southern Vietnam, peaking at 9.17 inches (23.3 cm) in Cần Thơ. The storm caused heavy damage in the country, particularly in the southernmost province of Cà Mau where it struck, but also in Bạc Liêu, Sóc Trăng, and Kiên Giang. The most severely affected regions were poor fishing communities. Overall, the storm damaged 139,445 houses and wrecked 76,609 more, which left 383,045 people homeless. Thousands of schools were damaged, and 130,815 dykes were breached. Additionally, the storm destroyed at least 3,122 boats. The rainfall also flooded 1,750 square miles (4,500 km^{2}) of rice paddy crop, about half of which in Cà Mau. A preliminary damage total was estimated at 7.18 trillion dongs (US$385 million).

Typhoon Linda caused considerable deaths in Vietnam. Many fishermen and sailors were caught at sea in the path of the storm, unable to escape its path. Within three days, the death toll in Vietnam was set at over 150, with thousands missing, many of them fishermen. By the fourth day after the storm, the toll reached 390, and on November 14, eight days after the storm, the death toll reached 464. Ultimately, the death toll was set at 3,111. Eight days after Linda's passage, a United Nations Department of Humanitarian Affairs (DHA) report indicated 857 people were injured by the storm. The government quickly established search and rescue teams, particularly for missing fishermen, and a total of 3,513 people were rescued after the storm. In the weeks after the storm, hundreds of dead bodies washed ashore in Vietnam and Thailand.

The Vietnamese government identified basic supplies that it needed in response to the storm; those included various foods, clothing, medicine, shelter supplies, and sanitation equipment. The country made a formal request for international assistance, noting that the storm was the worst in 100 years, and officials had limited resources due to the unexpected destruction. Prior to the request, the government of Switzerland sent about 500,000 Swiss francs (US$360,000) for immediate relief assistance. Subsequently, ten other countries sent cash or relief supplies worth $2.6 million, including medical shelters from the United States, clothing from the United Kingdom, tents from Russia, and transport goods from Japan. Red Cross workers had to travel by riverboat to bring aid to the most affected communities, due to the poor state of the roads. After two months, the Red Cross distributed 65,401 roofing sheets, 390 metric tons of rice, 11,990 mosquito nets, 6,871 blankets, 3,664 medical kits, and abundant clothing supplies to about 150,000 affected people; the supplies were purchased in Ho Chi Minh City. Eventually, the food supply and health status of the storm victims proved not as bad as originally feared. After the assistance was distributed, the Red Cross shifted focus toward reconstruction. Reconstruction was slow, partly due to a slowdown in economic activity from the Vietnamese New Year. Additionally, the two primary factories responsible for making iron and construction frames were only intermittently open, due to machines failing.

Elsewhere, moderate damage was also reported in Thailand, where at least 12 casualties were reported on land, and at least 152 fishermen were killed at sea. Flash flooding occurred in six districts, which damaged about 88 square miles (230 km^{2}) of croplands and destroyed 12 houses. Land transportation was affected, with 184 roads and 14 bridges damaged. The government of Thailand sent 20 medical teams to the most affected areas. Following the storm, about 10,600 people became sick from flood related diseases. Heavy rains fell in Tanintharyi Division in southeastern Burma (Myanmar), although because the winds were not strong, there was little damage. The typhoon increased smog and haze in Indonesia and Malaysia, which had been occurring for weeks. In Indonesia, the typhoon also removed atmospheric moisture, which lowered the chance for rain in areas affected by wildfires. Cambodia was also affected by the outskirts of the storm.

== See also ==
- Other tropical cyclones named Linda
- Other tropical cyclones named Openg
- Typhoon Durian
- Tropical Depression Wilma (2013)
- Typhoon Muifa (2004)
- Typhoon Tembin (2017)
