= List of storms named Robyn =

The name Robyn has been used for five tropical cyclones worldwide: two in the Western Pacific Ocean and three in the Australian Region.

In the Western Pacific:

- Tropical Storm Robyn (1990) (T9007, 08W, Deling) – a long-living tropical storm that caused minor impacts.
- Typhoon Robyn (1993) (T9307, 13W, Openg) – a Category 4 typhoon that affected Japan.

In the Australian Region:

- Cyclone Robyn (1975) – traversed much of the Indian Ocean.
- Cyclone Robyn (2010) – a tropical cyclone that stayed out in the central Indian Ocean.
- Cyclone Robyn (2024) – a deadly tropical cyclone that contributed towards heavy rains and flooding throughout the Indonesian islands of Sumatra and Java.
