= Typhoon Robyn =

Pacific typhoon in 1993

Typhoon Robyn (Openg)
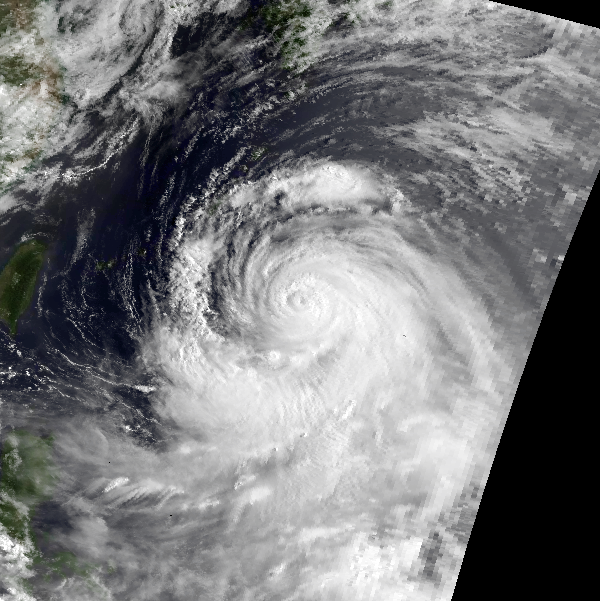
- Typhoon Robyn at peak intensity east of the Philippines on August 7

Meteorological history
- Formed: August 1, 1993
- Dissipated: August 11, 1993

Very strong typhoon
- 10-minute sustained (JMA)
- Highest winds: 155 km/h (100 mph)
- Lowest pressure: 940 hPa (mbar); 27.76 inHg

Category 4-equivalent typhoon
- 1-minute sustained (SSHWS/JTWC)
- Highest winds: 220 km/h (140 mph)
- Lowest pressure: 922 hPa (mbar); 27.23 inHg

Overall effects
- Fatalities: 54
- Damage: $178 million (1993 USD)
- Areas affected: Japan, South Korea, Russian Far East
- IBTrACS
- Part of the 1993 Pacific typhoon season

Typhoon Robyn, known in the Philippines as Typhoon Openg, was a mid-season tropical cyclone that brushed Japan during August 1993. Typhoon Robyn originated from a near equatorial monsoon trough in the eastern Caroline Islands in late July. Tracking west-northwest, a tropical depression developed on August 1, and became a tropical storm the next day. Following an increase in organization, Robyn obtained typhoon intensity on August 5. The typhoon briefly tracked west before veering to the northwest while intensifying. On August 7, Robyn attained its peak intensity of 160 km/h (99 mph), with a barometric pressure of 940 mbar (28 inHg). After passing through the Ryukyu Islands, Robyn skirted past western Kyushu on August 9 while steadily weakening. Midday on August 10, Robyn lost typhoon intensity over the Sea of Japan. The next day, the system was declared an extratropical cyclone.

In advance of the storm, 5,300 individuals were evacuated from Nagasaki Prefecture. Around 100 flights in and out of Kagoshima Airport were called off. Throughout Japan, nine people were killed, and fifty others were wounded. A total of 564 structures were destroyed, 80 homes were damaged, 220 houses were flooded, roads were cut in 15 locations, and two dikes were ruined. On the island of Kyushu, over 10,000 people fled their homes and around 285,000 households lost electricity. Damage in the country totaled ¥10.3 billion, equal to US$92.3 million. (Note: Many currencies are converted from Japanese yen to United States Dollars using this with an exchange rate of the year 1993.) (Note: All damage totals are in 1993 values of their respective currencies.) In South Korea, 45 people were killed and damage was estimated at US$86 million. The remnants of the storm also dropped rainfall across the Russian Far East.

== Meteorological history ==
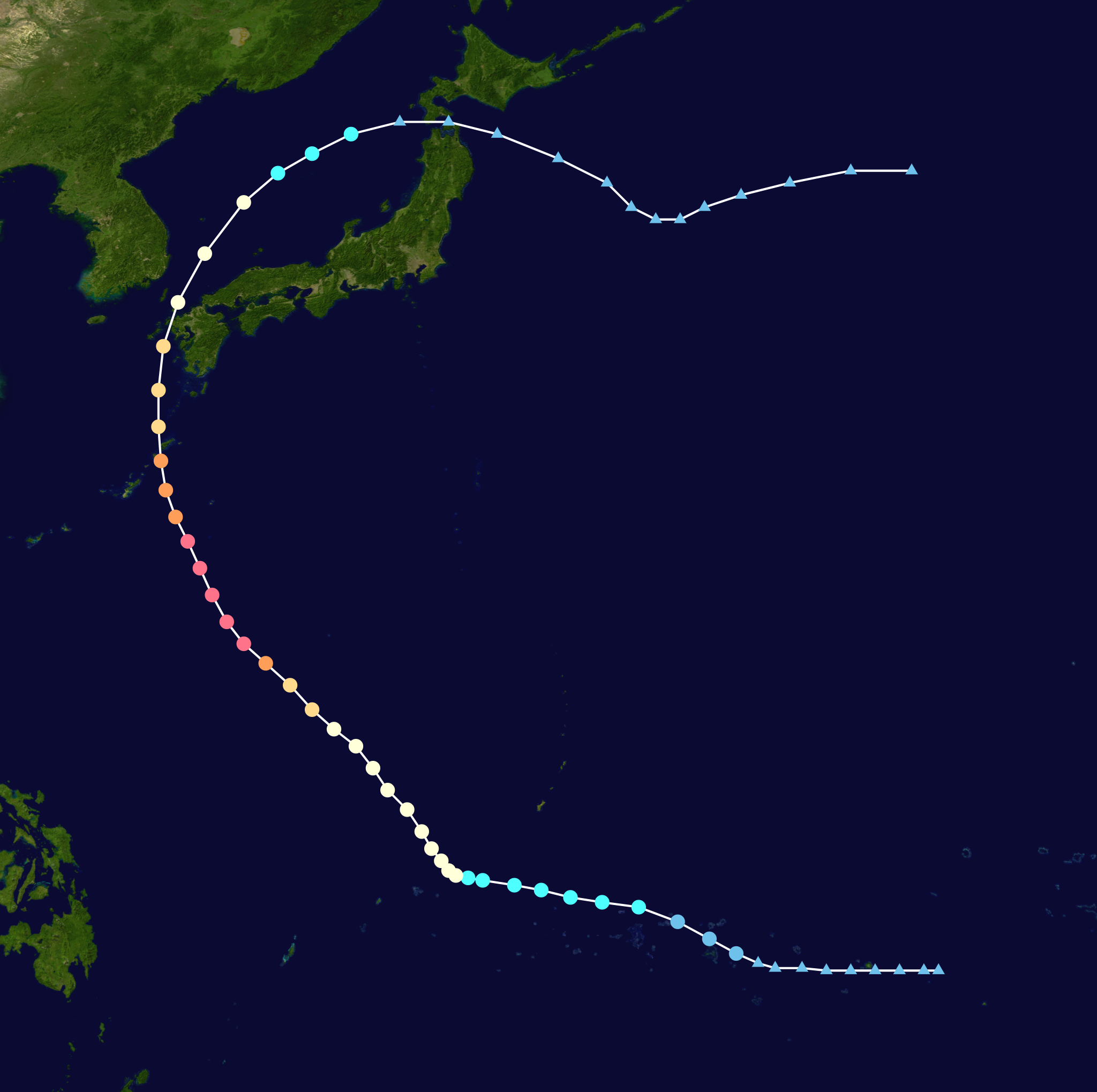
Map plotting the storm's track and intensity, according to the Saffir–Simpson scale Map key Saffir–Simpson scale Tropical depression (≤38 mph, ≤62 km/h) Tropical storm (39–73 mph, 63–118 km/h) Category 1 (74–95 mph, 119–153 km/h) Category 2 (96–110 mph, 154–177 km/h) Category 3 (111–129 mph, 178–208 km/h) Category 4 (130–156 mph, 209–251 km/h) Category 5 (≥157 mph, ≥252 km/h) Unknown Storm type Tropical cyclone Subtropical cyclone Extratropical cyclone, remnant low, tropical disturbance, or monsoon depression

The sixth and final tropical cyclone of July, Robyn originated from a near equatorial monsoon trough in the eastern Caroline Islands. At 06:00 UTC on July 30, the Joint Typhoon Warning Center (JTWC) started watching the system as thunderstorm activity had persisted as the disturbance tracked west-northwest. On the afternoon on July 31, a Tropical Cyclone Formation Alert was issued, following reports from Hurricane Hunters that a low-level center was forming. At 06:00 UTC on August 1, the Japan Meteorological Agency (JMA) upgraded the system into a tropical depression. (Note: The Japan Meteorological Agency is the official Regional Specialized Meteorological Center for the western Pacific Ocean.) (Note: Wind estimates from the JMA and most other basins throughout the world are sustained over 10 minutes, while estimates from the United States-based Joint Typhoon Warning Center are sustained over 1 minute. 10-minute winds are about 1.14 times the amount of 1-minute winds.) Based on Dvorak classifications of T1.5/50 km/h (30 mph), the JTWC followed suit several hours later. Both the JTWC and JMA upgraded the depression into Tropical Storm Robyn at 06:00 UTC on August 2, with the JTWC citing Dvorak estimates of T2.5/65 km/h (40 mph) as the reason for the upgrade. At the time of the upgrade, Robyn was located 465 km (290 mi) northwest of Chuuk.

Initially, Tropical Storm Robyn meandered erratically within a mesoscale convective system. At noon on August 3, the JMA upgraded Robyn into a severe tropical storm. Banding features increased in coverage that afternoon as the storm itself slowed down. Early on August 4, the JTWC estimated that Robyn attained typhoon intensity, although operationally, this was believed to have occurred 12 hours earlier, when Dvorak intensity estimates supported an intensity of 120 km/h (75 mph). Robyn then began to cease all westward movement and instead took a dive south, only to turn north and later northwest. According to the JMA, Robyn leveled off in intensity for 30 hours, and did not become a typhoon until noon on August 5. Early on August 6, data from the JTWC suggested that Robyn entered a period of rapid deepening over 36 hours, ending winds of 235 km/h (145 mph). The JMA disagrees, noting that only slight intensification occurred during this period. On August 7, the JMA estimated that Robyn attained its peak intensity of 160 km/h (100 mph), with a barometric pressure of 945 mbar (27.9 inHg). Starting late on August 7, the JTWC estimated that Robyn began a weakening trend, although according to the JMA, Robyn maintained its intensity through August 8, with its pressure further dropping to 940 mbar (28 inHg) After passing through the Ryukyu Island, Robyn skirted past western Kyushu on August 9 while steadily weakening. Midday on August 10, both the JTWC and JMA agreed that Robyn lost typhoon intensity over the Sea of Japan. The next day, both the JTWC and JMA classified the system as an extratropical cyclone.

== Impact ==
=== Japan ===
Prior to the arrival of the typhoon, forecasters noted that up to 500 mm (20 in) of rain could fall in parts of northern Kyushu and Shikoku and compared the storm's potential destruction to Typhoon Mireille, which struck the nation two years earlier. In Nagasaki Prefecture, about 5,300 people were evacuated from their homes at the foot of the Mount Unzen volcano due to fear of landslides. Under the anticipation of rough weather, about 100 flights out of Kagoshima Airport were canceled, with airports in numerous other prefectures also suspending flights. The Kadena Air Base was evacuated at 03:00 UTC on August 8. Starting on August 9, all bullet train services between Hakata and Hiroshima were suspended.

In addition to being one of three tropical cyclones to hit both Okinawa and Sasebo in 1993, the cyclone dropped heavy rainfall across much of the Japanese archipelago, which was already deluged by previous floods that killed over 40 people. A peak rainfall total of 651 mm (25.6 in) occurred at Nishiusuki District, including a record 595 mm (23.4 in) in 24 hours and 82 mm (3.2 in) in an hour. A wind gust of 155 km/h (96 mph) was recorded in Miyake-jima. A ship offshore Sasebo measured a minimum sea level pressure 969 mbar (28.6 inHg). Overall, nine people were killed, and fifty others were wounded. A total of 564 structures were destroyed, 80 homes were damaged, 220 houses were flooded, roads were cut in 15 locations, and 2 dikes were ruined. On the island of Kyushu alone, over 10,000 people fled their homes. Around 285,000 households lost electricity. Nationwide, damage was estimated at ¥10.3 billion or US$92.3 million.

Across Okinawa, 32 households lost power. A total of 1,752 ha (4,330 acres) crops were damaged, amounting to ¥106 million. In Ehime Prefecture, 13,316 homes lost electricity. A total of 18 homes were damaged, and roads were damaged in 121 locations. Twenty-two flights were delayed in the prefecture due to strong winds. Damage was estimated at ¥1.56 billion. In Miyazaki Prefecture, 406 homes were destroyed and 321 others were damaged. Three people were killed in the prefecture, including two Ebino – one due to a landslide and another due to a house collapsing. Thirteen people were wounded, including eleven in the northern portion of the prefecture. In the city of Kagoshima, 100 households lost power. Five people perished in the backyard of a private house in Tarumizu. Throughout Kagoshima Prefecture, 325 homes were destroyed, 23 homes were damaged, and 14 individuals were wounded. Damage there amounted to ¥2.35 billion, mostly from the fishing and agriculture industries. An Indonesian sailor from the Opo Soly was reported missing after his freighter tried to dock offshore Kagoshima Prefecture, although 13 others on board were rescued safely. Overall, five were presumed dead in Kagoshima Prefecture after a landslide buried all five family members under mud. Nearly 11,000 households were left without power in Amakusa. Crop damage in Kumamoto Prefecture was estimated at ¥2.67 billion. Eight people suffered injuries in Nagasaki Prefecture and damage there was estimated at ¥2.94 billion.

Roughly 30,000 people lost power due to downed trees in the city of Ōita. Damage in Ōita Prefecture amounted to ¥1.32 billion. A high school pupil was wounded in Imari while a 38-year-old in Karatsu was severely injured. Damage in Saga Prefecture was estimated at ¥427 million. Damage in Fukuoka Prefecture was estimated at ¥394 million and two people sustained injured in the prefecture. Eighteen landslides occurred in Hyōgo Prefecture. Crop damage in Okayama Prefecture was estimated at ¥90 million. One person was hurt in Hiroshima Prefecture and damage there was estimated at ¥233 million. Damage in Yamaguchi Prefecture was estimated at ¥835 million. Five people, including three seniors and one child, were injured in the prefecture due to strong winds, which also resulted in 46,000 customers losing power. Strong winds damaged 24 municipalities in Tottori Prefecture. There, one person was injured and damage was estimated at ¥149 million. As a result of rough weather conditions, 13 flights were cancelled at the Miho-Yonago Airport. A total of 428 ha (1,060 acres) of crops were damaged in Shimane Prefecture, amounting to ¥77.2 million. The extratropical remnants of the storm dropped heavy rainfall on the northernmost island of Hokkaido.

=== Elsewhere ===
Across the southern coast of South Korea, the storm brought rough seas up to 6.1 to 10.7 m (20 to 35 ft). Taegwalli Station received 342.3 mm (13.48 in) in a 24-hour period; this total was double the amount of rainfall typically observed in August. Meanwhile, Gangneung observed 220 and 216.1 mm (8.66 and 8.51 in) in separate 24 hour spans. A total of 45 people were killed in the country, including 39 in automobile traffic related deaths. One man was killed due to high winds in Pusan while at least three others were presumed dead across the southern portion of the country. There, around 1,800 ha (4,400 acres) of farmland was destroyed and damage was estimated at US$68 million. The extratropical remnants of Robyn later dropped 200 mm (8 in) in Vladivostok, part of the Russia Far East.

== See also ==
- Other tropical cyclones named Robyn
- Other tropical cyclones named Openg
- Typhoon Zola (1990) – similar early-season Western Pacific tropical storm that struck Japan
