= List of storms named Openg =

The name Openg was used for nine tropical cyclones in the Philippines by the PAGASA (and its predecessor, the Philippine Weather Bureau) in the Western Pacific Ocean.

- Typhoon Harriet (1965) (T6513, 16W, Openg) – hit Taiwan as a Category 3-equivalent typhoon.
- Typhoon Flossie (1969) (T6912, 15W, Openg) – a typhoon which affected the Philippines, Taiwan and Japan, killing 75; considered by JTWC as merely a high-end tropical storm.
- Severe Tropical Storm Vera (1973) (T7321, 23W, Openg) – the final named storm of the 1973 season; affected the Philippines.
- Typhoon Dinah (1977) (T7712, 12W, Openg) – struck the Philippines before having an erratic track in the South China Sea, resulting to 54 lives lost.
- Typhoon Thad (1981) (T8115, 15W, Openg) – made landfall in Japan, causing widespread damage amounting to $1.03 billion and killing 43 people.
- Severe Tropical Storm Andy (1985) (T8519, 18W, Openg) – hit Hainan and northern Vietnam at peak intensity, ultimately causing the deaths of 46 individuals.
- Typhoon Sarah (1989) (T8919, 22W, Openg) – a powerful typhoon which affected the Philippines, Taiwan and China, claiming 71 lives in total.
- Typhoon Robyn (1993) (T9307, 13W, Openg) – mid-season typhoon that impacted Japan and South Korea, resulting to 54 fatalities.
- Severe Tropical Storm Linda (1997) (T9726, 30W, Openg) – a strong tropical storm which later crossed into the North Indian Ocean after making landfalls in Vietnam and Thailand; considered as the most devastating typhoon to hit southern Vietnam, killing at least 3,111 people, in addition to 164 fatalities in Thailand.
