= Tropical Storm Kai-tak =

Pacific tropical storm in 2017

Tropical Storm Kai-tak (Urduja)
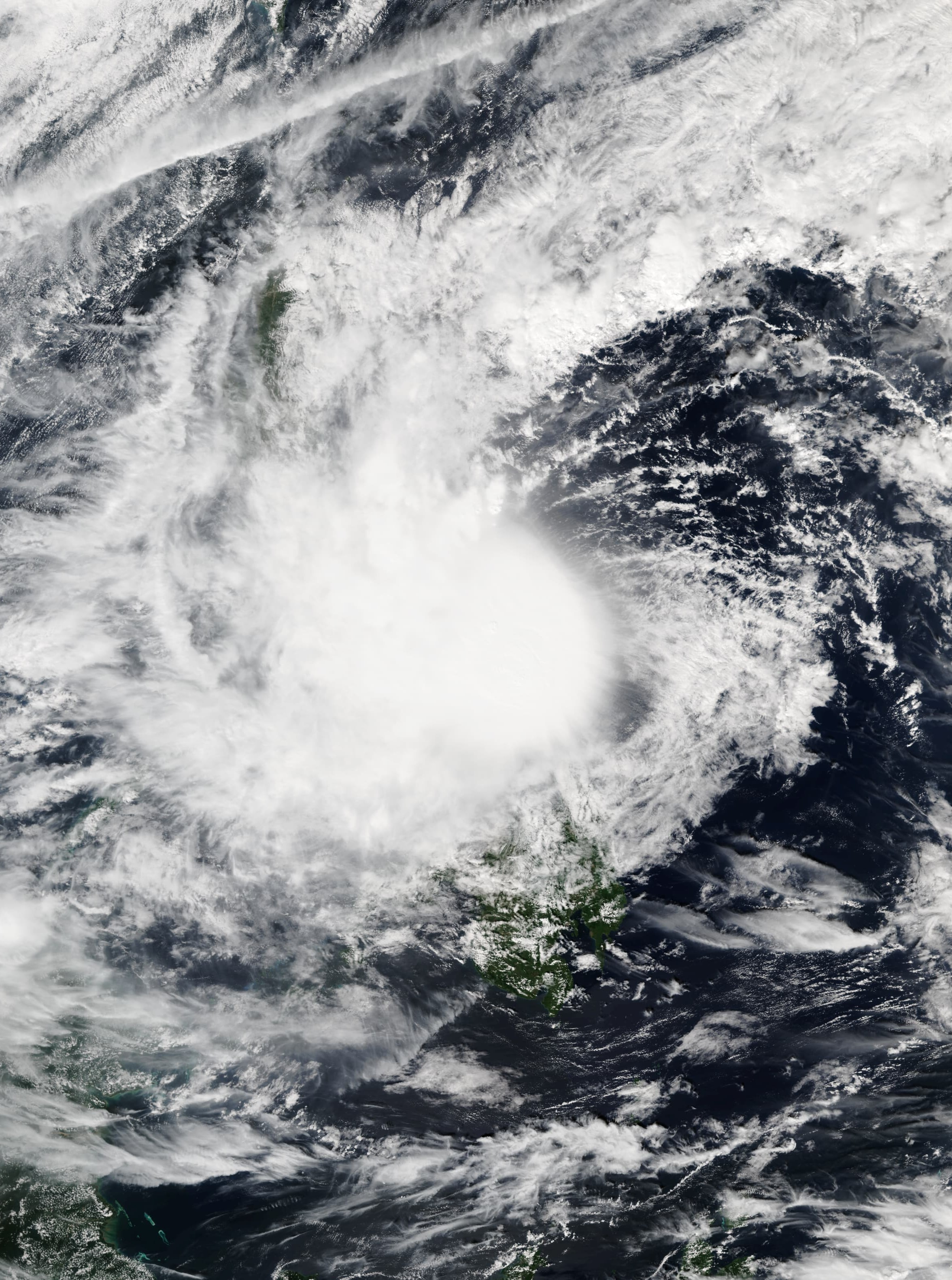
- Tropical Storm Kai-tak making landfall in the Philippines on December 16

Meteorological history
- Formed: December 13, 2017
- Dissipated: December 23, 2017

Tropical storm
- 10-minute sustained (JMA)
- Highest winds: 75 km/h (45 mph)
- Lowest pressure: 994 hPa (mbar); 29.35 inHg

Tropical storm
- 1-minute sustained (SSHWS/JTWC)
- Highest winds: 95 km/h (60 mph)
- Lowest pressure: 985 hPa (mbar); 29.09 inHg

Overall effects
- Fatalities: 83 total
- Damage: $74.3 million (2017 USD)
- Areas affected: Caroline Islands, Philippines, Malaysia
- IBTrACS
- Part of the 2017 Pacific typhoon season

Tropical Storm Kai-tak, known in the Philippines as Tropical Storm Urduja, was a weak but deadly late-season tropical cyclone that affected the Philippines during mid-December 2017. The twenty-sixth named storm of the 2017 Pacific typhoon season, Kai-tak developed as a tropical depression near Palau on December 11. It gradually intensified into a tropical storm on December 14. Kai-tak made landfall in Samar on December 16 and traversed the Philippine Islands before continuing west-southwestward and dissipating on December 23 near Malaysia.

As the storm approached the Philippines, PAGASA issued storm warnings to Eastern Visayas and other regions. Families were evacuated to shelters and schools as residents were advised to take caution. Local governments opened shelters, monitored the storm, and suspended classes. After crossing the Philippines, the storm progressed over the South China Sea and later affected Brunei and Malaysia. The system caused significant damage due to its slow motion in the Philippines, particularly in Eastern Visayas. Ports were disrupted, causing tourists to be stranded. Flooding occurred in Tacloban and several other major cities, including southern provinces like Zamboanga. It also generated heavy flooding in Brunei and Malaysia, causing one fatality, though it did not make landfall in either country. In the Philippines, the storm produced 83 deaths and US$74.3 million (Note: Based on 2017 United States dollars) in damage. Severe flooding and landslides led to extensive rescue and relief operations. Owing to its impacts, both of the names Kai-tak and Urduja were retired.

== Meteorological history ==
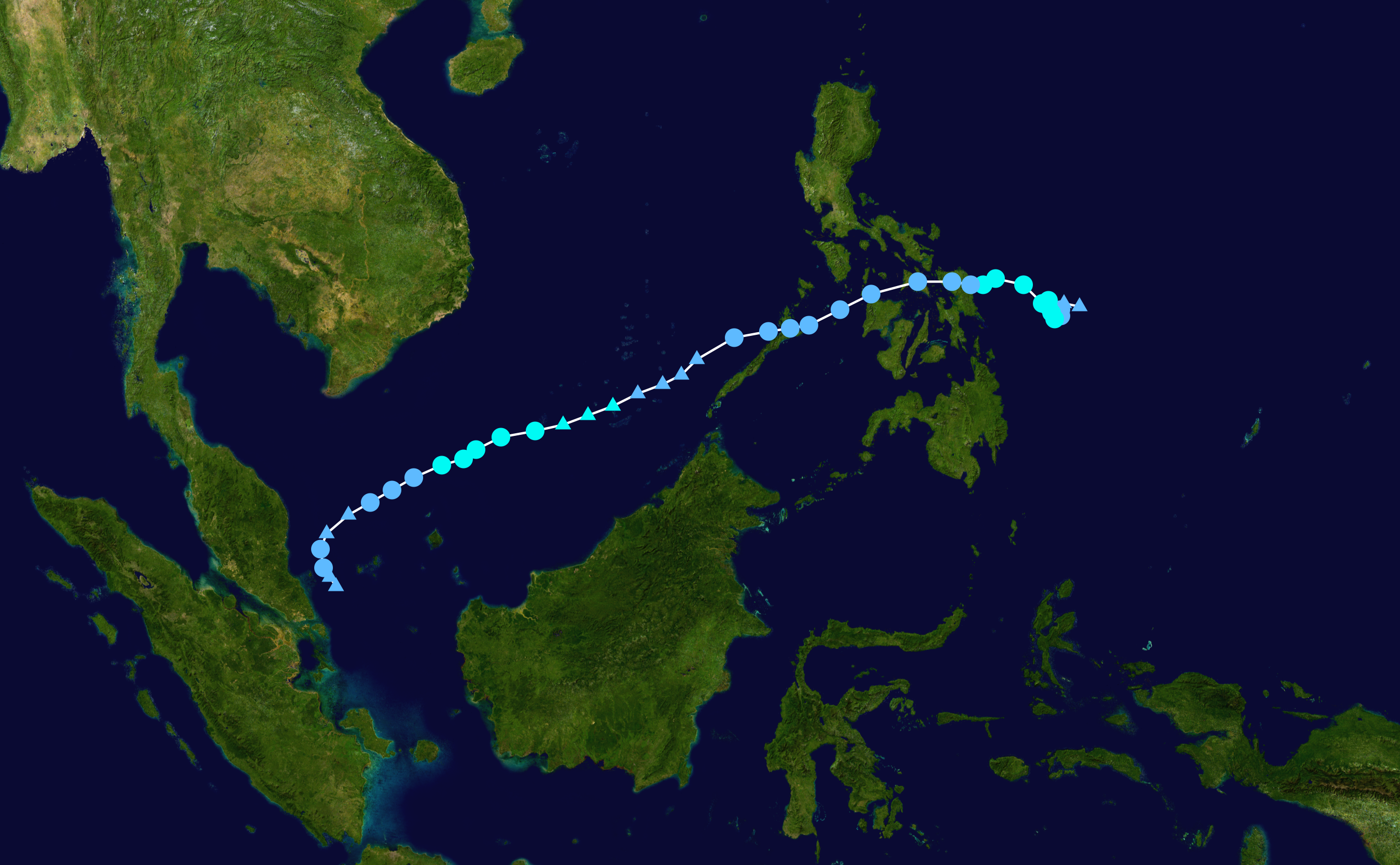
Map plotting the storm's track and intensity, according to the Saffir–Simpson scale Map key Saffir–Simpson scale Tropical depression (≤38 mph, ≤62 km/h) Tropical storm (39–73 mph, 63–118 km/h) Category 1 (74–95 mph, 119–153 km/h) Category 2 (96–110 mph, 154–177 km/h) Category 3 (111–129 mph, 178–208 km/h) Category 4 (130–156 mph, 209–251 km/h) Category 5 (≥157 mph, ≥252 km/h) Unknown Storm type Tropical cyclone Subtropical cyclone Extratropical cyclone, remnant low, tropical disturbance, or monsoon depression

Kai-tak originated from a near-equatorial trough. On December 10, the Joint Typhoon Warning Center (JTWC) began monitoring a low-pressure area located about 130 kilometers (80 miles) east of Palau. The disturbance gradually expanded in favorable conditions and warm seas, though moderate vertical wind shear limited its development. The Japan Meteorological Agency (JMA) classified the system as a weak tropical depression the next day and began issuing advisories at 00:00 UTC on December 12, reporting it as stationary. Approximately 15 hours later, the Philippine Atmospheric, Geophysical and Astronomical Services Administration (PAGASA) classified it as a tropical depression and assigned the local name Urduja. At that time, the storm was 480 km (300 mi) northeast of Hinatuan, Surigao del Sur.

The system moved little in the following days due to a weak steering current between subtropical ridges over the western Pacific, Bay of Bengal, and to the storm's south. On December 13, the JTWC issued a Tropical Cyclone Formation Alert. At 21:00 UTC on that same day, the JTWC upgraded it to a tropical depression, designated it 32W, and began issuing advisories. The system remained poorly organized with loose banding although it was located in an area of very low wind shear. Three hours later, both the JTWC and JMA upgraded it to a tropical storm after better organization and banding, with the latter assigning the international name Kai-tak. (Note: The name Kai-tak (Cantonese: 啟德, [kʰɐi˧˥ tak˧]) was contributed by Hong Kong and refers to Kai Tak Airport in Cantonese.) It was listed as the twenty-sixth named storm in the 2017 Pacific typhoon season.

On December 14, the storm expanded, with better convection and proper maintenance after the convective maximum, despite persistent wind shear. At around 12:00 UTC, Kai-tak reached its peak intensity with 10-minute sustained winds at 75 kilometres per hour (45 miles per hour). After, the storm drifted east towards Samar Island, going back and forth in a circle-like manner in the following days. The system eventually journeyed back towards Northern Samar. Outflow was stronger near the pole than the equator while forecasts anticipated further intensification. On December 15, Kai-tak weakened due to strong wind shear and remained stationary after subtropical ridges were distinguished to the north and northeast. Seven hours later, the system had undergone deep convective diurnal maximum, covering the low-level circulation center. The convection then collapsed shortly after.

On December 16 at 03:00 UTC, JTWC marked 1‑minute sustained winds of about 95 km/h (60 mph). Later that day, the storm weakened to a tropical depression and made landfall in San Policarpo, Eastern Samar, at approximately 13:30 PHT (Note: Philippine local time is referred to as PHT, with a time reference to UTC of +8 hours.) (05:30 UTC) on December 16. On December 17, it made additional landfalls at the Visayas archipelago: on Mobo, Masbate, at approximately 10:00 PHT (02:00 UTC), Sibuyan Island at approximately 12:00 PHT (04:00 UTC), and Malay, Aklan, at 18:00 PHT (10:00 UTC). It then made landfall on Cuyo, Palawan, at 23:00 PHT (15:00 UTC) and on Taytay, Palawan, the next day at 6:00 PHT (22:00 UTC), leaving the Philippines. A brief reduction in wind shear allowed Kai-tak to regain tropical storm status on December 20, but it weakened back to a depression the next day as shear increased again. Despite weakening, the storm affected Malaysia and Brunei before dissipating over the South China Sea on December 23.

== Preparations ==
=== Philippines ===
Animation of issued PSWS for Kai-Tak, locally named Urduja, when crossing the Philippines

On December 12, cloudy skies and thunderstorms were foreseen in Mindanao, with a possibility of flash floods and landslides in nearby regions. On December 14, as PAGASA upgraded Kai-tak (Urduja) to a tropical storm, Tropical Cyclone Warning Signal (TCWS) No. 2 (Note: TCWS No. 2 indicates that the storm has a wind speed of 60–120 km/h (37–75 mph).) was raised in Eastern Samar, Samar, and Biliran while TCWS No. 1 (Note: This means that strong winds of up to 60 km/h (37 mph) are expected within 36 hours.) was issued for Catanduanes, Camarines Sur, Albay, Sorsogon, Masbate, Romblon, Northern Samar, Southern Leyte, Leyte, northern Cebu, Capiz, Aklan, and northern Iloilo. Signal No. 1 covered most of the Bicol Region and much of Visayas, with forecasts of moderate-to-heavy rain within 400 km (250 mi) of the storm's center. Residents were already advised to prepare against flooding as the moderate-to-heavy rainfall area was extended to a 500 km (310 mi) diameter. On December 15, PAGASA warned of possible storm surge of 4.1–14 metres (4.5–15.3 yards) in Samar. Classes were suspended across all levels in the Bicol Region and all local government units in Mimaropa were placed on red alert. On December 17, 17 areas were downgraded from Signal No. 2 to Signal No. 1. At least 1,418 individuals were relocated to evacuation centers and schools and classes were suspended in 14 provinces. Two hundred families evacuated due to floods in parts of Mindanao. One hundred stranded passengers in the port of Tabaco, Albay, were sheltered at a local elementary school after sea travel was suspended. A National Disaster Risk Reduction and Management Council (NDRRMC) situational report released on December 16 perceived 38,846 individuals staying in evacuation centers. The next day, NDRRMC said that 89,000 people had fled to evacuation centers. Disaster responders in the Bicol Region were urged to prepare for the storm as some residents placed sandbags on the roofs of their homes for protection.

=== Brunei and Malaysia ===
Shortly before landfall, Brunei's government issued a red weather alert warning residents about the risk of flooding. The Brunei Meteorological Department advised citizens to take measures to be protected from the storm due to possible flooding and landslides. In Malaysia, the government closely monitored the storm and notified nearby villages for rain. Warnings were issued to eight states, namely: Sabah, Sarawak, Kelantan, Perak, Perlis, Kedah, Penang Island, and Terengganu.

== Impact ==
An animation showing the rainfall for Kai-tak

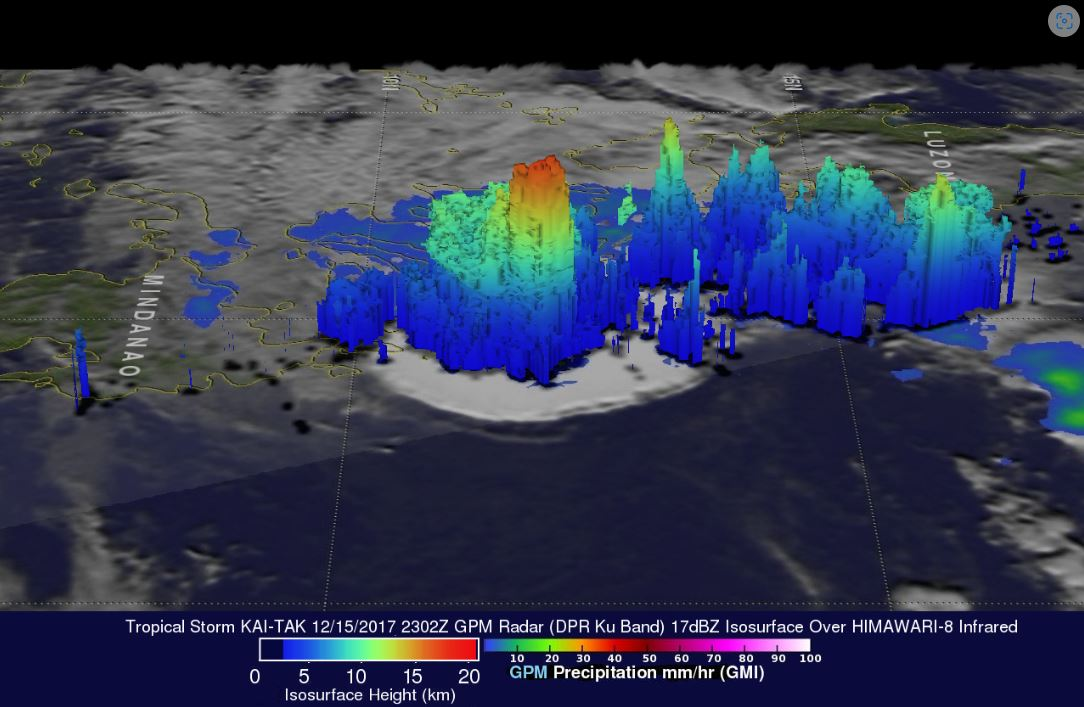
Analysis of the rainfall of the tropical storm

=== Philippines ===
Tropical Storm Kai-tak caused major damage to the Philippines. The NDRRMC confirmed 83 deaths and reported ₱3.747 billion (US$74.3 million) in infrastructure and agricultural damage, affecting 44,500 farmers. A case study estimated 35,286 homes were damaged, with 2,748 totally destroyed and 32,538 partially damaged. The study also exhibited that 1,800,000 individuals were affected by the storm. Power lines in 39 settlements were downed and several bridges collapsed.

The Tacloban local council declared a state of calamity after flooding in 80 of the 130 villages. Sea travel in the affected areas was suspended. Flooding and landslides caused 31 deaths in the province of Biliran, including 23 in a landslide in the Naval barangay of Lucso-on. Three people died in the province of Leyte, including a boy who drowned in the town of Mahaplag, a woman buried by a landslide, and another individual who fell into a flooded manhole in Ormoc. Vice-Governor of Eastern Samar Marcelo Picardal reported that half the towns in Eastern Samar were flooded. Classrooms in Catbalogan were used to shelter families. The mayor of Ormoc placed the city in a state of calamity, stating in a post: "More work ahead. To the residents of this city, Pls [sic] lend some of your valuable time to help our fellow Ormocanon". Flooding affected 98% of Boracay due to rainwater from the storm.

Families were affected in Mimaropa, the Western Visayas, and Caraga as well. At Matnog Port, vehicle queues stretched for 5 km (3.1 mi). Some stranded passengers took shelter in the municipal gym while others waited in their respective buses, without internet or charging stations. The storm left four people dead and one missing in the Bicol Region while two fatalities and 78 injuries were reported in Mimaropa. The DSWD also reported power outages in the provinces of Romblon and Marinduque.

The storm stranded 52 vessels and 1,322 cargo shipments. The Port of Manila was damaged. Nine ports in Eastern Visayas had disrupted operations due to inclement weather, with more than 1,000 people stranded at the Port of Jubasan. Eleven ports in the Bicol Region were disrupted, including the Port of Matnog, where 3,000 passengers were trapped. Seven ports in Western Visayas were affected, though service was largely uninterrupted. In Calabarzon, five ports were deranged, including the Port of Calapan with 1,000 passengers stuck. Three ports in Central Visayas were also affected, though only 18 passengers were stranded.

Damage in Eastern Samar, Masbate, and nearby areas exceeded ₱543,000 (US$9,500), while agricultural losses were over ₱400 million (US$6.9 million). Tacloban experienced flash floods up to heights of 1.5 m (4.9 ft), destroying 2,000 hectares (4,900 acres) of rice fields—roughly 90% of Tacloban's rice. The flood contaminated Tacloban City's supply of tap water. Subsequent impacts were reported in Cagayan de Oro, Lanao del Sur and Norte, and parts of the Zamboanga Peninsula. Rainfall reached 1,067 millimetres (42.0 inches) in Guiuan, 812 mm (32.0 in) at Borongan Airport, and 1,000 mm (39 in) outside of Eastern Visayas.

=== Brunei and Malaysia ===
Although Kai-tak did not make landfall on Brunei and Malaysia, heavy flooding and strong winds still affected the two countries. On December 19 and 20, heavy flooding in Brunei displaced 94 people. The flood affected 22 communities and damaged 137 houses. A boat capsized in Kampong Ayer, causing one death. A car swerved into floodwaters in Limbang, Malaysia. A couple escaped from the car, but one passenger died from drowning. On December 19, Kai-tak entered the South China sea, bringing additional rainfall in the eastern portion of Malaysia. Malaysia experienced a high tide of 2.9 m (9.5 ft), causing several coastal areas to flood and debris to accumulate in roads. Some places in Senadin were submerged by up to 0.6 m (2.0 ft) of floodwater. A river flood submerged two longhouses.

== Aftermath ==
=== Philippines ===
The retrieval operations are still ongoing but we are not finding anyone alive. We only find dead bodies.

— Sofronio Dacillo

After the storm, retrieval operations started. Forty people were declared missing; most of them were presumed dead. In Biliran, bulldozers were used to retrieve bodies. Military units conducted rescues in flooded areas. President Rodrigo Duterte paid a visit to the storm-affected areas. Affected people were brought to shelters, with local charities supplying tap water. Local government units distributed shelter materials and aid. Local Municipal Social Welfare and Development Offices (MSWD) in Biliran offered 40 social workers to distribute aid. Assistance of ₱184 million (US$3 million) was given by the Department of Social Welfare and Development, local government units, and other charities. The DSWD distributed 1,050 meal packs to the Bicol Region.

In Eastern Sama, the charity ACTED distributed about 10,000 kits to the municipalities of Salcedo and Mercedes. In Tacloban, SM Supermalls distributed 1,390 relief packs, with the City Social Welfare and Development Office (CSWDO) assisting 5,035 families. Damage to two main bridges in Biliran prompted the president to order the Department of Public Works and Highways (DPWH) to immediately fix the bridges. Philippine Red Cross immediately responded with assistance in the town of San Policarpo, Eastern Samar. During relief operations, New People's Army (NPA) rebels allegedly attacked soldiers in Northern Samar, wounding two of them. Allegations of human rights violations followed and the incident strained government–NPA relations while the NPA denied all the allegations. On December 22, Typhoon Tembin (Note: Known locally as Typhoon Vinta.) impacted the Mindanao archipelago, resulting in 266 deaths.

In January 2018, Cabucgayan Mayor Edwin Masbang encouraged tree-planting as a way of storm protection. He announced a forestation project assisted by the Department of Environment and Natural Resources. A recovery project was subsequently initiated by the Shelter Cluster in coordination with government agencies. The project had three parts: the planning, which was initiated in December and was finished in January; implementation, which was deployed shortly after and ended in February; and then the second phase, in partnership with community-based organization CBO, which was begun in April and ended at the end of the year. Supplies were loaded in a warehouse and distributed to beneficiaries. In total, 900 kits, 57 tents, 1,914 solar lights, 1,800 mosquito nets, 1,795 water carriers, and 1,800 blankets were distributed. House Representative Yedda Marie Romualdez established a bill to create a national disaster response agency; the bill is still pending since 2022.

=== Brunei and Malaysia ===
On December 21, Government assistance gave supplies to the affected individuals. Two officials visited flood affected areas. Sultan Hassanal Bolkiah provided assistance and donations to flood affected areas, particularly Temburong District.

=== International ===
China gave ₱5 million (US$100 thousand) to the Philippines to help rebuilding efforts. The funds were presented by Sun Yi of the Chinese Embassy in Manila, representing the Chinese Red Cross. The Secretary-General of the Philippine Red Cross, Oscar Palabyab, stated "the Chinese side has always been the first to respond and extend helping hands whenever the Philippines and its people are in [state of] difficulties." The impacts of the storm garnered a sympathetic response by the Chinese Foreign Minister Wang Yi.

=== Retirement ===
On December 21, 2017, PAGASA retired the name Urduja within the Philippine Area of Responsibility (PAR) after it caused more than ₱1 billion (US$17 million) in damages. The department replaced Urduja with Uwan for the 2021 season, a Cebuano word for rain. However, due to the limited number of typhoons that entered PAR on that year, the name went unused, and was used instead for the first and only time during the 2025 season.

Due to the damage and high death toll in Visayas, the name Kai-tak was officially retired during the 50th annual session of the ESCAP/WMO Typhoon Committee in February 2018. In February 2019, the Typhoon Committee replaced the name with Yun-yeung; (Note: Replacement name originally made by China.) its first usage was during the 2023 season.

== See also ==
- Tropical cyclones in 2017
- Weather of 2017
- List of Philippine typhoons (2000–present)
- Tropical Storm Thelma (1991)
- Tropical Storm Haikui (2017)
- Typhoon Tembin (2017) – wreaked havoc in the southern Philippines a few days after Kai-tak
- Tropical Storm Megi (2022)
- Typhoon Kalmaegi (2025)
