= List of storms named Linda =

The name Linda has been used for eleven tropical cyclones worldwide.

In the Eastern Pacific:

- Tropical Storm Linda (1985) – minimal tropical storm that crossed into the Central Pacific as a tropical depression.
- Hurricane Linda (1991) – Category 3 hurricane which recurved out to sea.
- Hurricane Linda (1997) – Category 5 hurricane that became the third-most intense hurricane in the Eastern Pacific basin with a minimum pressure of 902 mbar. Also the second strongest hurricane in the Pacific in terms of 1-minute sustained winds.
- Hurricane Linda (2003) – Category 1 hurricane that never affected land.
- Hurricane Linda (2009) – Category 1 hurricane that caused no damages or deaths.
- Hurricane Linda (2015) – Category 3 hurricane which affected Baja California, bringing heavy rainfall and deadly flash flooding to Utah.
- Hurricane Linda (2021) – long-lived Category 4 hurricane that stayed out at sea.

In the Australian region:

- Tropical Cyclone Linda (1976) – made landfall south of Darwin, Australia.
- Tropical Cyclone Linda (2004) – persisted out to sea.
- Tropical Cyclone Linda (2018) – never affected land.

In the Western Pacific:

- Tropical Storm Linda (1997) – catastrophic system which killed over 3,123 people in various parts of Southeast Asia. Considered the worst storm in southern Vietnam in over a century. Also called Openg in the Philippines, and BOB 08 in the North Indian Ocean.
