= Cyclone Helen (2013) =

North Indian Ocean cyclone in 2013

Severe Cyclonic Storm Helen
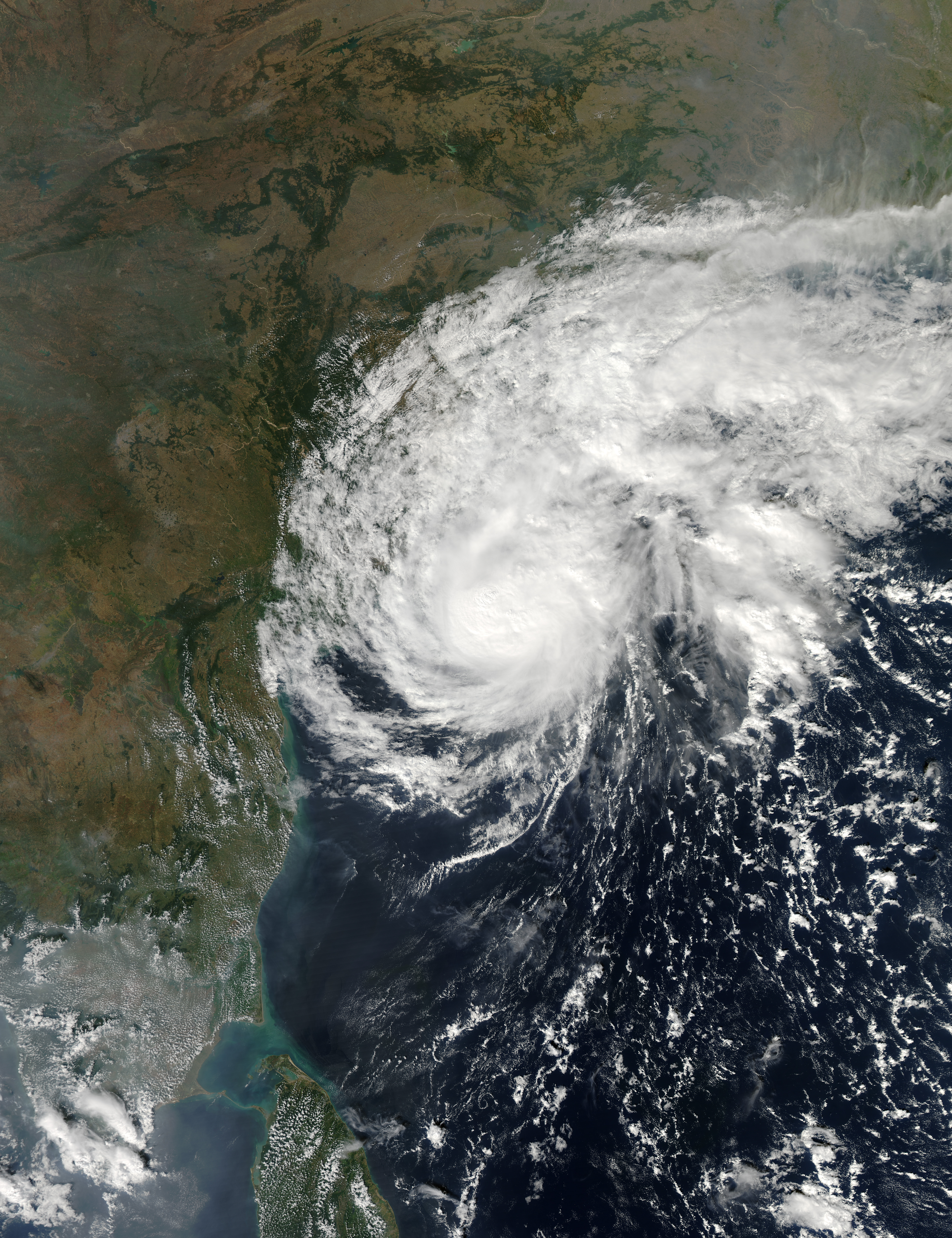
- Helen near peak intensity on 21 November

Meteorological history
- Formed: 19 November 2013
- Dissipated: 23 November 2013

Severe cyclonic storm
- 3-minute sustained (IMD)
- Highest winds: 100 km/h (65 mph)
- Lowest pressure: 990 hPa (mbar); 29.23 inHg

Category 1-equivalent tropical cyclone
- 1-minute sustained (SSHWS/JTWC)
- Highest winds: 130 km/h (80 mph)
- Lowest pressure: 970 hPa (mbar); 28.64 inHg

Overall effects
- Fatalities: 10
- Damage: $796 million (2013 USD)
- Areas affected: Andhra Pradesh
- IBTrACS
- Part of the 2013 North Indian Ocean cyclone season

Severe Cyclonic Storm Helen (Note: The name was suggested by Bangladesh, which is derived from the Greek origin/Western-style word meaning light or torch.) (/ˈhɛlən/) was a relatively weak tropical cyclone that formed in the Bay of Bengal Region on 18 November 2013, from the remnants of Tropical Storm Podul. It was classified as Deep Depression BOB 06 by the India Meteorological Department on 19 November. As it was moving on a very slow northwest direction on 20 November, it became Cyclonic Storm Helen as it brought light to heavy rainfall in eastern India. It then became a Severe Cyclonic Storm on the afternoon hours of 21 November. The storm then made landfall over Andhra Pradesh and dissipated shortly after.

Governments alerted residents and evacuated them, with a total of 20,000 evacuated residents. Government teams were prepared to help relief efforts, with a video conference created by the Minister of Revenue to plan possible preparations. Extensive damage was reported, with uprooted trees and power disruption reported. A total of 10 people died, with a damage of Rs50 billion (US$796 million).

== Meteorological history ==
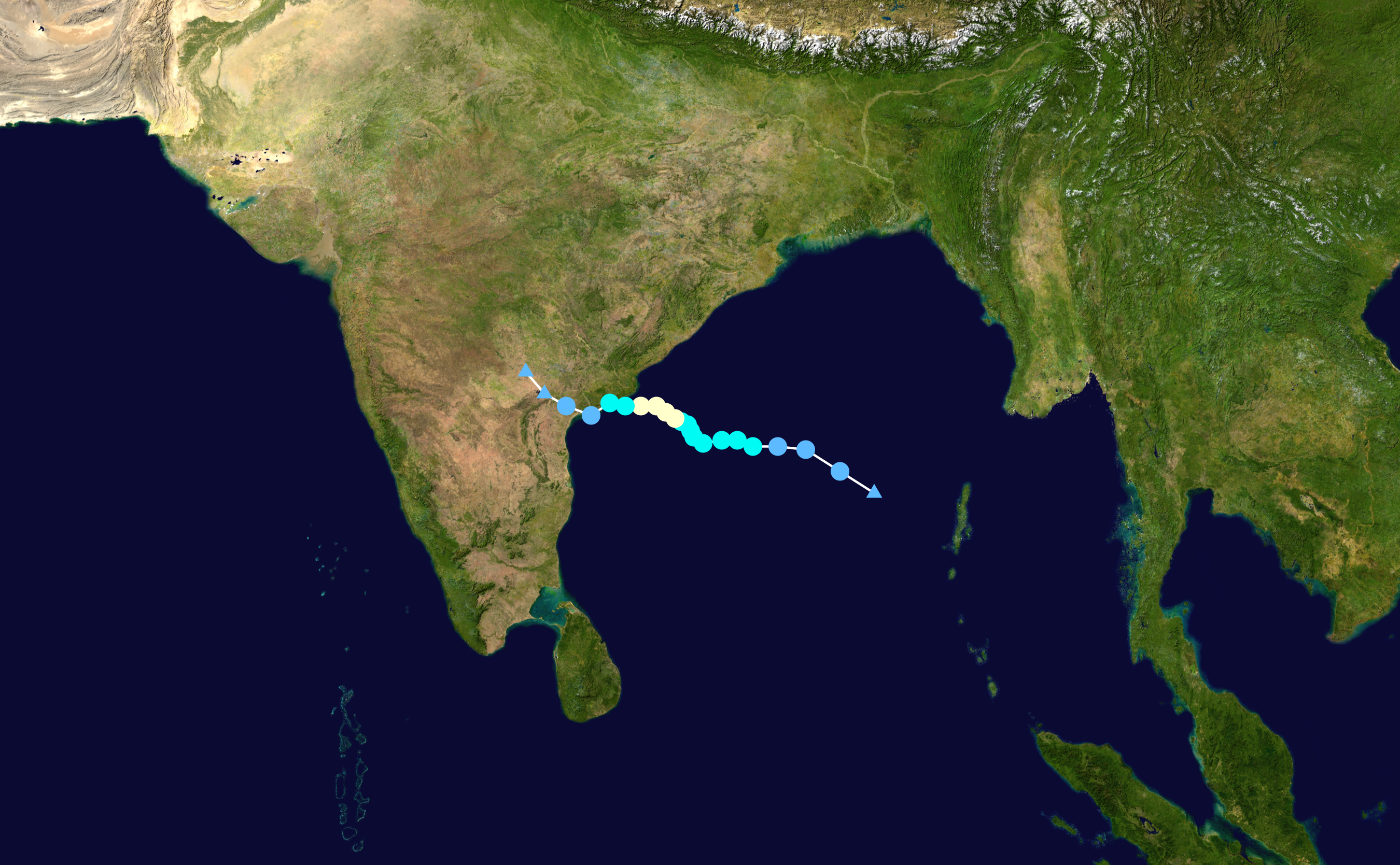
Map plotting the storm's track and intensity, according to the Saffir–Simpson scale Map key Saffir–Simpson scale Tropical depression (≤38 mph, ≤62 km/h) Tropical storm (39–73 mph, 63–118 km/h) Category 1 (74–95 mph, 119–153 km/h) Category 2 (96–110 mph, 154–177 km/h) Category 3 (111–129 mph, 178–208 km/h) Category 4 (130–156 mph, 209–251 km/h) Category 5 (≥157 mph, ≥252 km/h) Unknown Storm type Tropical cyclone Subtropical cyclone Extratropical cyclone, remnant low, tropical disturbance, or monsoon depression

Late on 17 November, the remnant energy of Tropical Storm Podul contributed to the development of a trough over the Bay of Bengal, located near the Andaman Islands. During the next couple of days, the storm slowly organized and consolidated, prompting the Joint Typhoon Warning Center (JTWC) to issue a Tropical Cyclone Formation Alert (TCFA) during the early hours of 19 November. Later on the same day, the India Meteorological Department (IMD) upgraded the storm to a depression, classifying it as BOB 06, followed by the JTWC reporting that the storm had reached Tropical Storm strength. A couple of hours later, the IMD upgraded BOB 06 into a Deep Depression, as the storm continued to intensify.

The storm slowly drifted west-northwestward, while deep convection consolidated around the system's well-defined center of circulation. In the early hours of 20 November, the IMD classified BOB 06 as a Cyclonic Storm, thereby officially naming it Helen. Early on 21 November, Helen continued to intensify into a Severe Cyclonic Storm, reaching its peak intensity of 100 km/h (62 mph) with a central pressure of 990 mbar (29 inHg). Shortly before landfall, the storm's convection sheared to the north, causing its low-level circulation to fully expose followed by the JTWC issuing its final bulletin, reporting that the storm had weakened due to land interaction. Helen made landfall south of Machilipatnam, Andhra Pradesh and rapidly deteriorated into a deep depression.

== Preparations and impact ==
The Andhra Pradesh government alerted all coastal districts of the state, especially southern coastal districts. The district collectors were directed to evacuate people from low-lying areas near the coast. Andhra Pradesh also alerted fishermen. More than 20,000 people were evacuated from the areas affected by the storm. Three districts, specifically district administrations were alerted to warn people for flash floods. Minister of Revenue Raghu Veera Reddy started a video conference with district collectors to plan possible preparedness for the disaster. The government of Krishna district prepared four relief teams. An estimated 130 relief camps were opened. Six teams from the National Disaster Response Force were deployed to help relief work, following 450 people deployed from the State Disaster Management Force. One helicopter was also prepared in case.

Helen brought extensive damage to Machilipatnam in Krishna district, with uprooted trees and electric lines. The districts of Krishna, East Godavari and Srikakulam, Visakhapatnam and Guntur suffered heavy rainfall. Heavy damage to harvest crops was also reported, with the West Godavari district being worst affected. Paddy, coconut and banana crops have suffered damage. Power disruption was also reported around the affected areas. The agricultural loss in Andhra Pradesh were amounted to be Rs50 billion (US$796 million). A total of 10 deaths have been reported in incidents related to the cyclone. Including one block development officer. Major crop damage was reported, with multiple areas flooded. Three boats carrying 20 fishermen were reported missing, out of which two were reported as safe. The Coast Guard's vessel Avantibai and an HAL Chetak helicopter of the Navy have been dispatched for search and rescue of the third boat.

== See also ==
- Cyclone Viyaru
- Cyclone Maarutha
- Cyclone Bijli
- Cyclone Nilam
- Cyclone Laila
- Cyclone Phailin
