= Tropical Storm Podul (2013) =

Pacific tropical storm in 2013

Tropical Storm Podul (Zoraida)
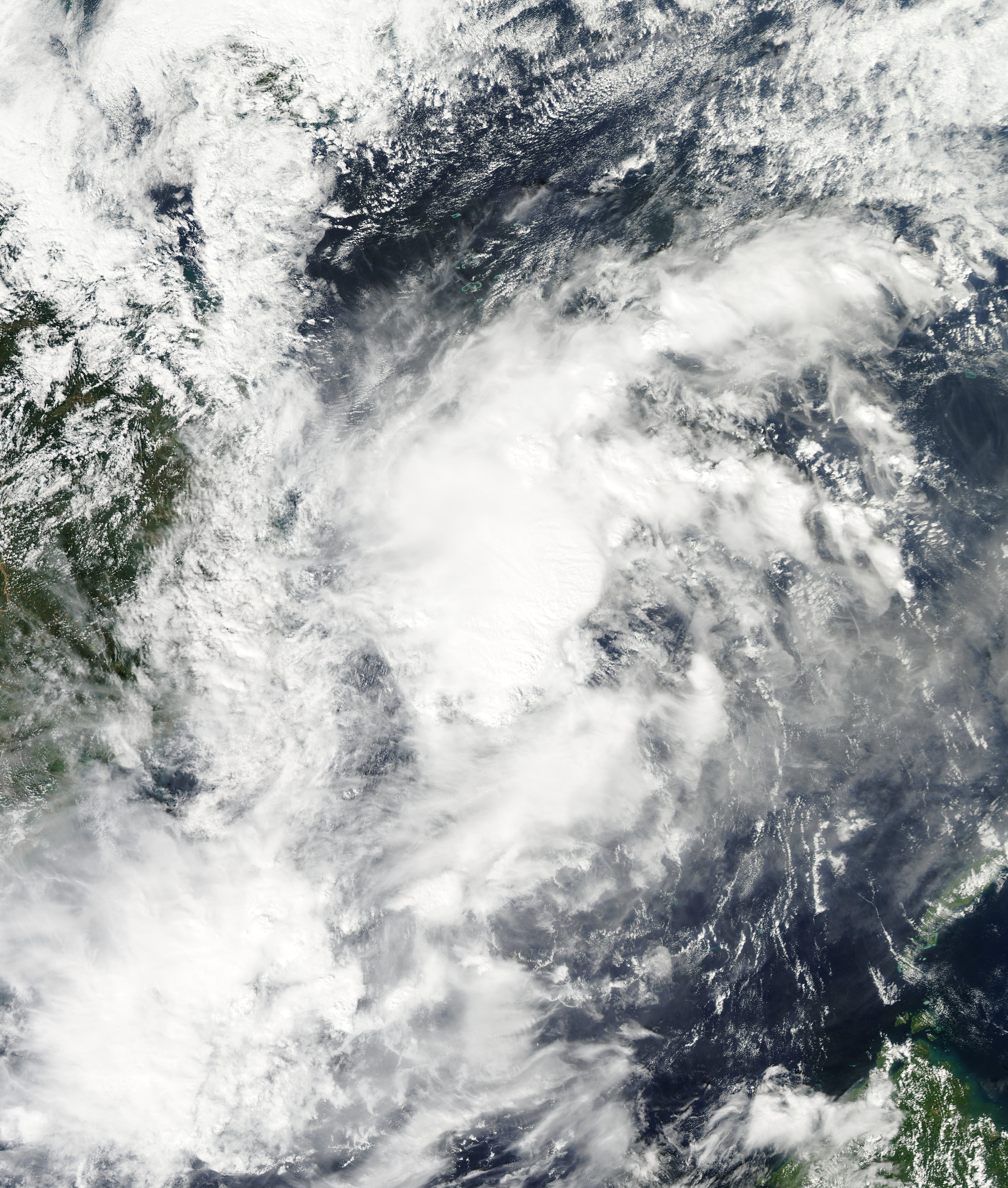
- Podul shortly before being named on November 14

Meteorological history
- Formed: November 11, 2013
- Dissipated: November 15, 2013

Tropical storm
- 10-minute sustained (JMA)
- Highest winds: 65 km/h (40 mph)
- Lowest pressure: 1000 hPa (mbar); 29.53 inHg

Tropical depression
- 1-minute sustained (SSHWS/JTWC)
- Highest winds: 55 km/h (35 mph)
- Lowest pressure: 1000 hPa (mbar); 29.53 inHg

Overall effects
- Fatalities: 46 total
- Damage: $194 million (2013 USD)
- Areas affected: Palau, Philippines, Vietnam, Cambodia, Thailand, Laos
- IBTrACS
- Part of the 2013 Pacific typhoon season

Tropical Storm Podul, known in the Philippines as Tropical Depression Zoraida, was a weak but destructive tropical cyclone that struck the Philippines and Vietnam in mid-November 2013, shortly after the devastation caused by Typhoon Haiyan. The 31st named storm of the annual typhoon season, Podul originated as a tropical depression on November 11 between Palau and the Philippine island of Mindanao. The system moved west-northwestward and made landfall in Davao Oriental on Mindanao on November 12, bringing heavy rainfall that killed two people and hampered relief operations following Haiyan. After crossing the Philippines, the depression strengthened into Tropical Storm Podul on November 14. Shortly thereafter, the storm struck southeastern Vietnam and dissipated the following day.

In Vietnam, Podul produced heavy rainfall that resulted in severe and widespread flooding that damaged or destroyed 427,258 houses. Overall damages reached ₫4.1 trillion (US$194.1 million) (Note: All currencies in this article are in 2013 values if not specified), with 44 fatalities and 66 injuries reported.

== Meteorological history ==
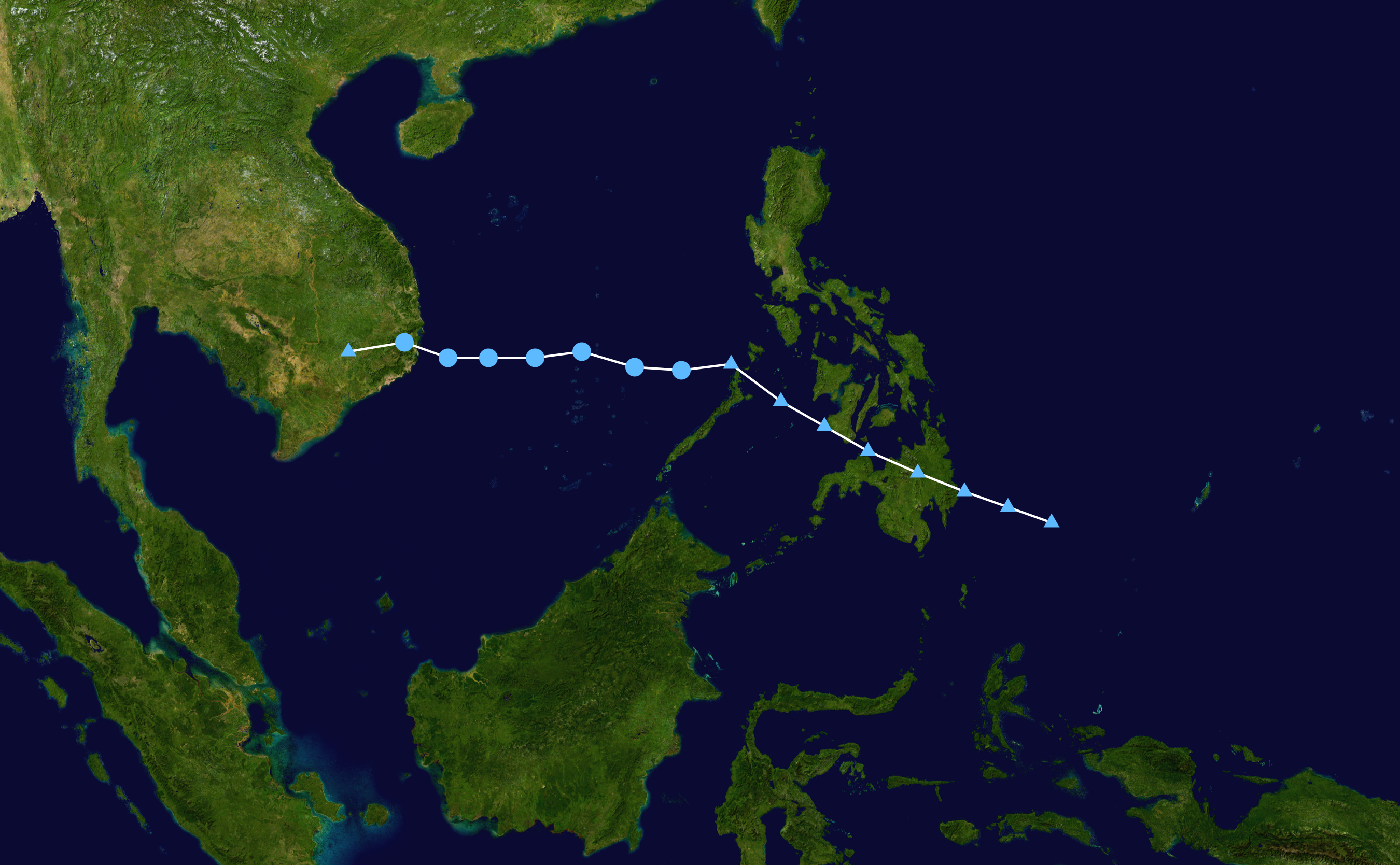
Map plotting the storm's track and intensity, according to the Saffir–Simpson scale Map key Saffir–Simpson scale Tropical depression (≤38 mph, ≤62 km/h) Tropical storm (39–73 mph, 63–118 km/h) Category 1 (74–95 mph, 119–153 km/h) Category 2 (96–110 mph, 154–177 km/h) Category 3 (111–129 mph, 178–208 km/h) Category 4 (130–156 mph, 209–251 km/h) Category 5 (≥157 mph, ≥252 km/h) Unknown Storm type Tropical cyclone Subtropical cyclone Extratropical cyclone, remnant low, tropical disturbance, or monsoon depression

On November 9, an area of disorganized convection, or thunderstorms, persisted about 1,175 km (730 mi) southeast of Palau. The system consisted of a broad circulation, affected to its detriment by moderate wind shear. Moving west-northwestward, the convection persisted and organized into the circulation, indicative of an increased potential for tropical cyclogenesis. Late on November 10, the Joint Typhoon Warning Center (JTWC) (Note: The Joint Typhoon Warning Center is a joint United States Navy – United States Air Force task force that issues tropical cyclone warnings for the western Pacific Ocean and other regions.) issued a Tropical Cyclone Formation Alert (TCFA), meaning the agency anticipated a tropical depression would develop within 24 hours. Shortly thereafter, the Philippine Atmospheric, Geophysical and Astronomical Services Administration (PAGASA) initiated advisories on Tropical Depression Zoraida after the system entered its area of responsibility of the agency. At 1200 UTC on November 11, the Japan Meteorological Agency (JMA) (Note: The Japan Meteorological Agency is the official Regional Specialized Meteorological Center for the western Pacific Ocean.) estimated that a tropical depression formed about halfway between Palau and the Philippine island of Mindanao, although operationally the agency had classified the system two days prior.

After passing south of Palau, the system's circulation became more broad and its convection became less organized, despite decreased wind shear. Early on November 12, the depression made landfall on Mindanao in Davao Oriental province. Shortly thereafter, PAGASA discontinued advisories on Zoraida, declaring that the depression degenerated into a low pressure area. By contrast, the JMA continued monitoring the depression as it moved through the Philippines and into the Sulu Sea. On November 13, the center crossed over Palawan island into the South China Sea. At 1200 UTC the next day, the JMA upgraded the depression to a tropical storm named Podul about 275 km (171 mi) east of the Vietnam coast. (Note: The name Podul (Korean: 버들, [pɔ̹dɯɭ]) was contributed by North Korea and means willow in Korean.) Around the same time, the JTWC began issuing warnings on the system as a tropical depression 32W, noting that convection had rapidly increased over the circulation. The agency also mentioned the continued presence of wind shear, although warm water temperatures and moderate outflow were expected to allow intensification. Although the JMA estimated peak 10–minute winds of 65 km/h (40 mph), the JTWC only estimated tropical depression-force 1–minute winds of 45 km/h (28 mph).

Late on November 14, Podul made landfall in southeastern Vietnam near Phan Rang–Tháp Chàm and quickly weakened into a tropical depression. The JTWC assessed the circulation was dissipating near the coast, and the JMA declared Podul dissipated at 1200 UTC on November 15. Operationally, the agency tracked the system into the Gulf of Thailand, and the Thai Meteorological Department tracked Podul to near the Malay Peninsula on November 16, before ceasing advisories on the storm. The remnants later redeveloped into Severe Cyclonic Storm Helen in the Bay of Bengal, which later struck southeastern India on November 22 before dissipating.

== Preparations and impact ==
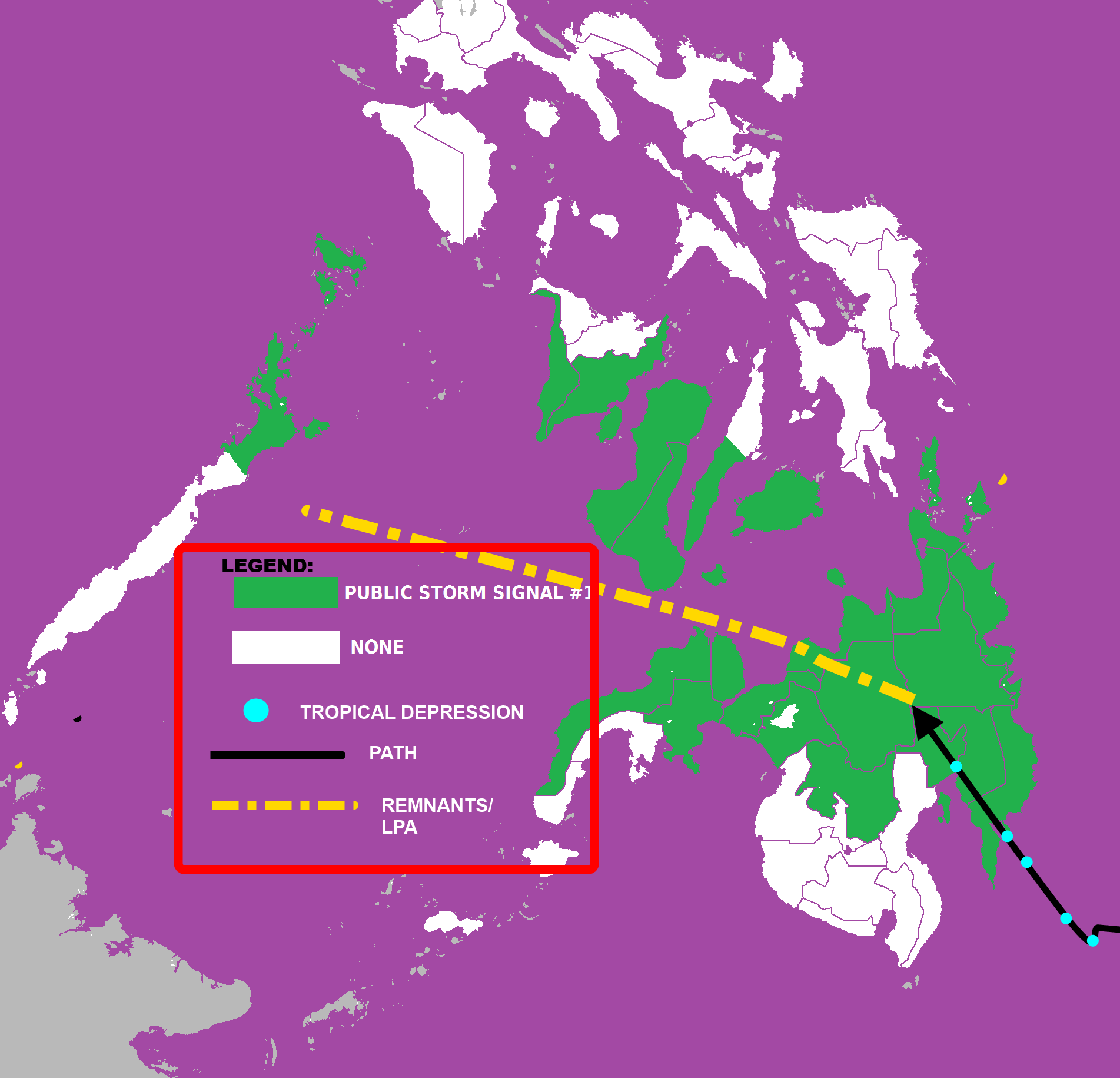
The Philippine Public Storm Warning Signal of Tropical Depression Zoraida (Podul), with its path and direction

The Guam National Weather Service warned of the potential of heavy rainfall and high surf for Palau and nearby Yap island. While passing south of Palau, the system produced light winds of about 28 km/h (17 mph).

Late on November 10, as the system moved into the Philippine area of responsibility, PAGASA issued the Public Storm Warning Signal Number 1 for seven areas in Mindanao, indicating the potential for winds between 30–60 km/h (20–35 mph). Over the next day these warnings were extended to cover three provinces in Luzon, eight provinces in Visayas and twenty-one provinces in Mindanao. On Cebu Island, officials ordered schools to close during the storm's passage. After the extreme damage due to Typhoon Haiyan in the Philippines, the depression that became Podul affected the same areas just days later, which affected rescue work. The depression caused additional difficulties in travel and communications. In addition to causing a landslide in Monkayo, flooding from the depression covered roads and forced about 1,000 families to evacuate. In Davao del Norte, the depression resulted in river flooding that killed two people.

In Vietnam, Podul produced heavy rainfall, peaking at 973 mm (38.3 in) in two districts in Quảng Ngãi Province. The rains caused flooding that forced over 78,000 people to flee their homes, including 1,400 the resort town Hội An where floodwaters reached 1.6 m (5.2 ft) deep. High volumes of flooding caused water to be released from reservoirs, which some local officials credited for the widespread flooding. About 260 km (160 mi) of canals and dykes were washed away during the storm. The high rainfall increased water levels along rivers, with the Ba River in Gia Lai Province reaching 410 mm (16 in) higher than the record set in 1981. Flooding also damaged over 6,000 ha (15,000 acres) of crops, mostly to rice. Podul damaged or flooded about 280,000 m^{2} (3,000,000 ft^{2}) of roadways and bridges, resulting in traffic jams, and halted three train lines. The storm damaged or destroyed 427,258 houses, and overall damage was estimated at 4.1 trillion₫ (2013 Vietnamese đồng, $194.12 million 2013 USD). Throughout Vietnam, Podul killed 44 people and injured 74 others. By November 20, the floods began receding from most locations. Newspapers described the flooding as the worst in Vietnam since 1999. After the storm, the Vietnamese provincial governments assisted in rebuilding houses and roads.

== See also ==
- Weather of 2013
- Tropical cyclones in 2013
- Typhoon Hester (1971) – typhoon that moved across southern Philippines and later struck Vietnam
- Tropical Storm Kim (1983)
- 1999 Vietnamese floods
