= 2013 North Indian Ocean cyclone season =

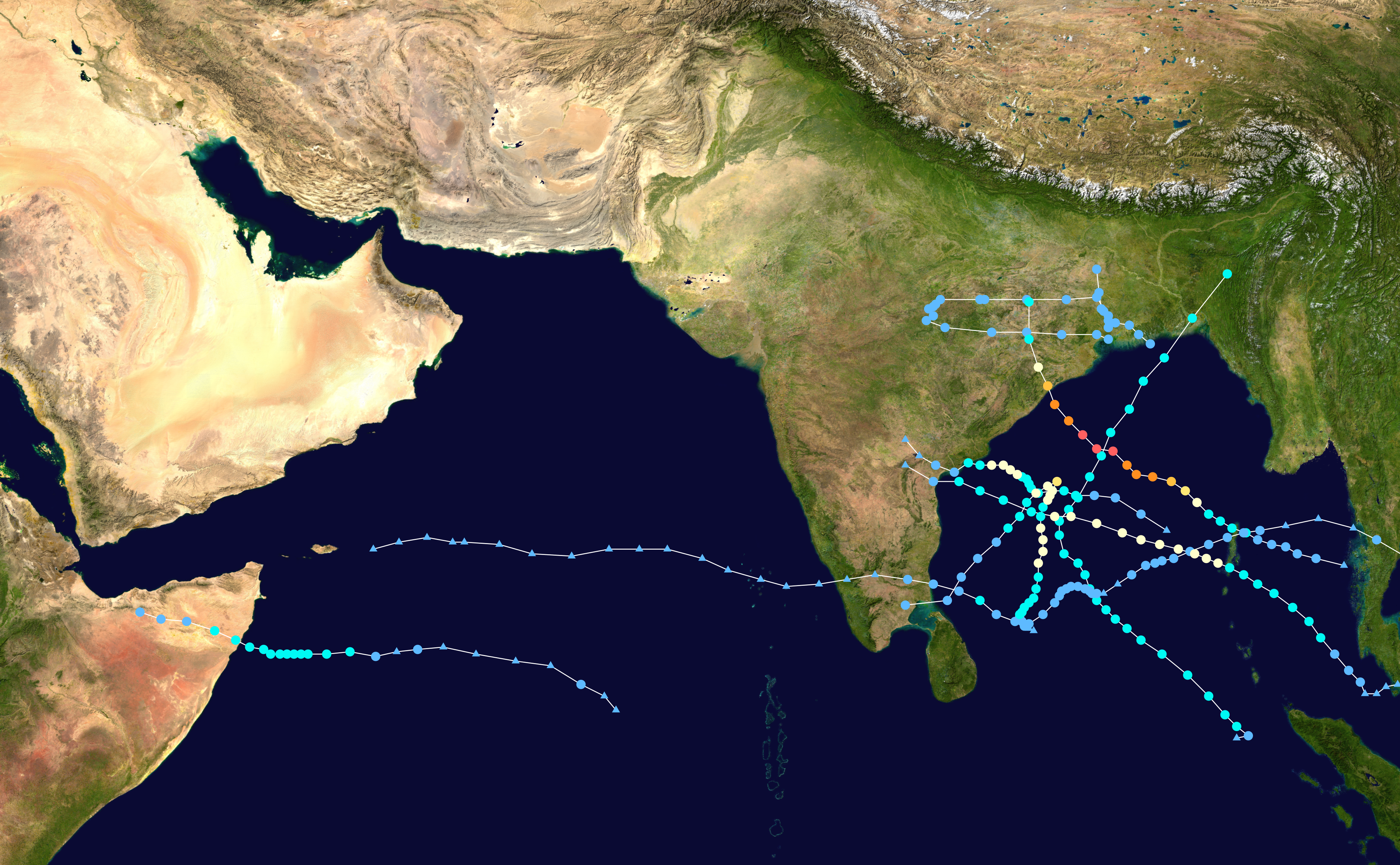
- Season summary map

Seasonal boundaries
- First system formed: May 10, 2013
- Last system dissipated: December 13, 2013

Strongest storm
- Name: Phailin
  - Maximum winds: 215 km/h (130 mph) (3-minute sustained)
  - Lowest pressure: 940 hPa (mbar)

Seasonal statistics
- Depressions: 10
- Deep depressions: 6
- Cyclonic storms: 5
- Severe cyclonic storms: 4
- Very severe cyclonic storms: 3
- Extremely severe cyclonic storms: 1
- Total fatalities: 323 total
- Total damage: > $5.09 billion (2013 USD)

Related articles
- Timeline of the 2013 North Indian Ocean cyclone season; 2013 Atlantic hurricane season; 2013 Pacific hurricane season; 2013 Pacific typhoon season

The 2013 North Indian Ocean cyclone season was an above average and deadly season. The season had no official bounds, but cyclones typically formed between May and December, with the peak from October to November. These dates conventionally delimit the period of each year when most tropical cyclones form in the northern Indian Ocean.

The scope of this article is limited to the Indian Ocean in the Northern Hemisphere, east of the Horn of Africa and west of the Malay Peninsula. There are two main seas in the North Indian Ocean — the Arabian Sea to the west of the Indian subcontinent, abbreviated ARB by the India Meteorological Department (IMD); and the Bay of Bengal to the east, abbreviated BOB by the IMD. The systems that form over land are abbreviated as LAND.

The official Regional Specialized Meteorological Centre in this basin is the India Meteorological Department (IMD), while the Joint Typhoon Warning Center releases unofficial advisories. On average, 4 to 6 storms form in this basin every season.

== Season summary ==
After a five-month break in tropical cyclone activity over the basin, the first depression of the year developed over the southern Bay of Bengal on May 10, 2013. The system subsequently developed into Cyclonic Storm Viyaru during May 12, before it made landfall near Chittagong, Bangladesh during May 16. As a result of the formation of Viyaru, the low level equatorial monsoon flow strengthened over southern parts of the North Indian Ocean, which in turn allowed the south-west monsoon to set in over the Andaman Sea and parts of the Bay of Bengal during May 17. A depression developed and made landfall on West Bengal, during May 29, before it was last noted during May 31. During June 1, the south-west monsoon set in over Kerala, the Maldives and parts of the south and central Arabian Sea. Over the next two weeks one of the fastest onsets of the monsoon over India was observed After the monsoon had set in over Kerala, one of the fastest onsets of the monsoon over India was observed, with the whole nation covered by June 16 or about a month earlier than normal. Reasons for the fast onset included a favourable phase of the Madden–Julian oscillation and the west-northwest movement of an area of low pressure between June 12–16.

== Systems ==
=== Cyclonic Storm Viyaru ===
- Cyclonic storm (IMD)
- Tropical storm (SSHWS)
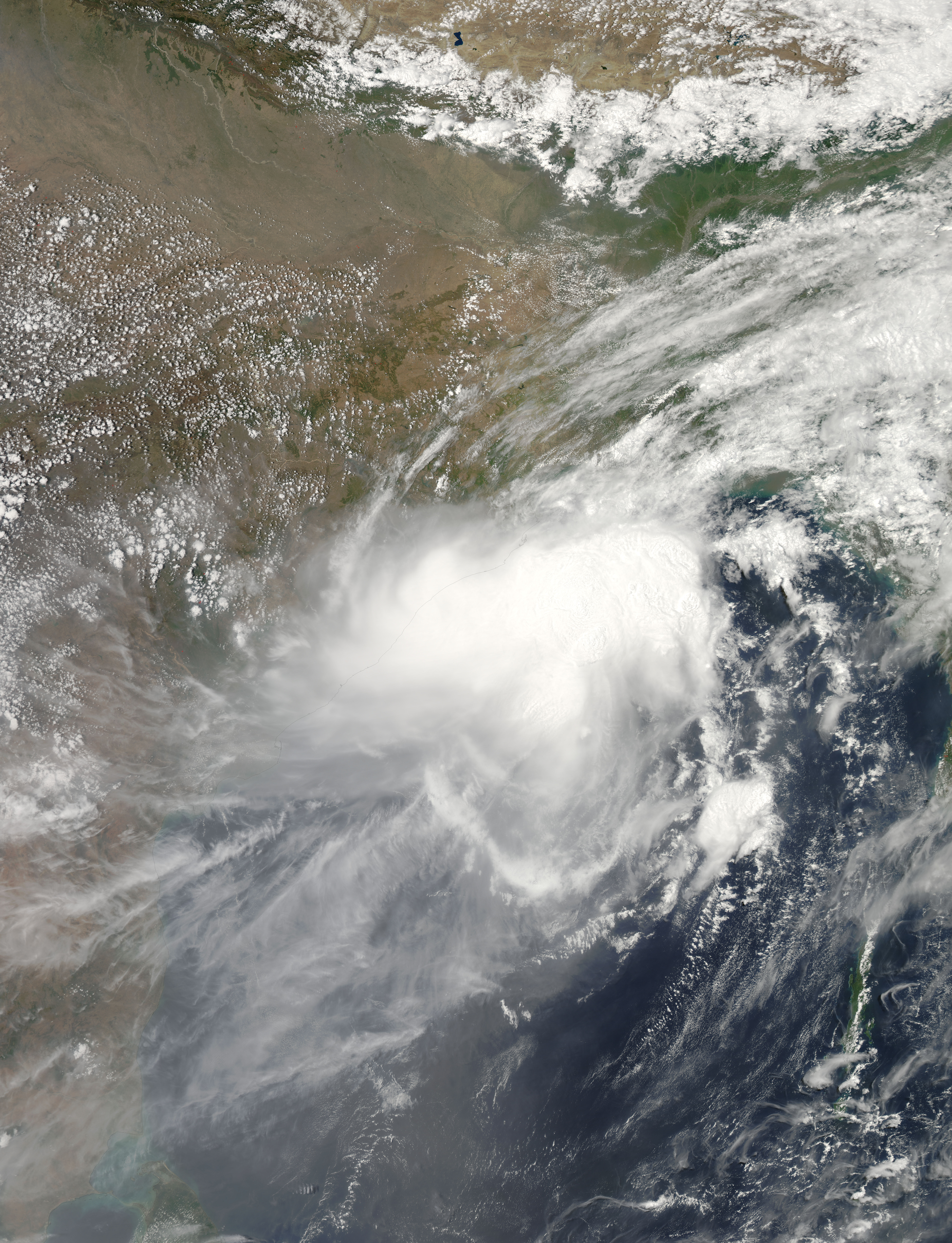
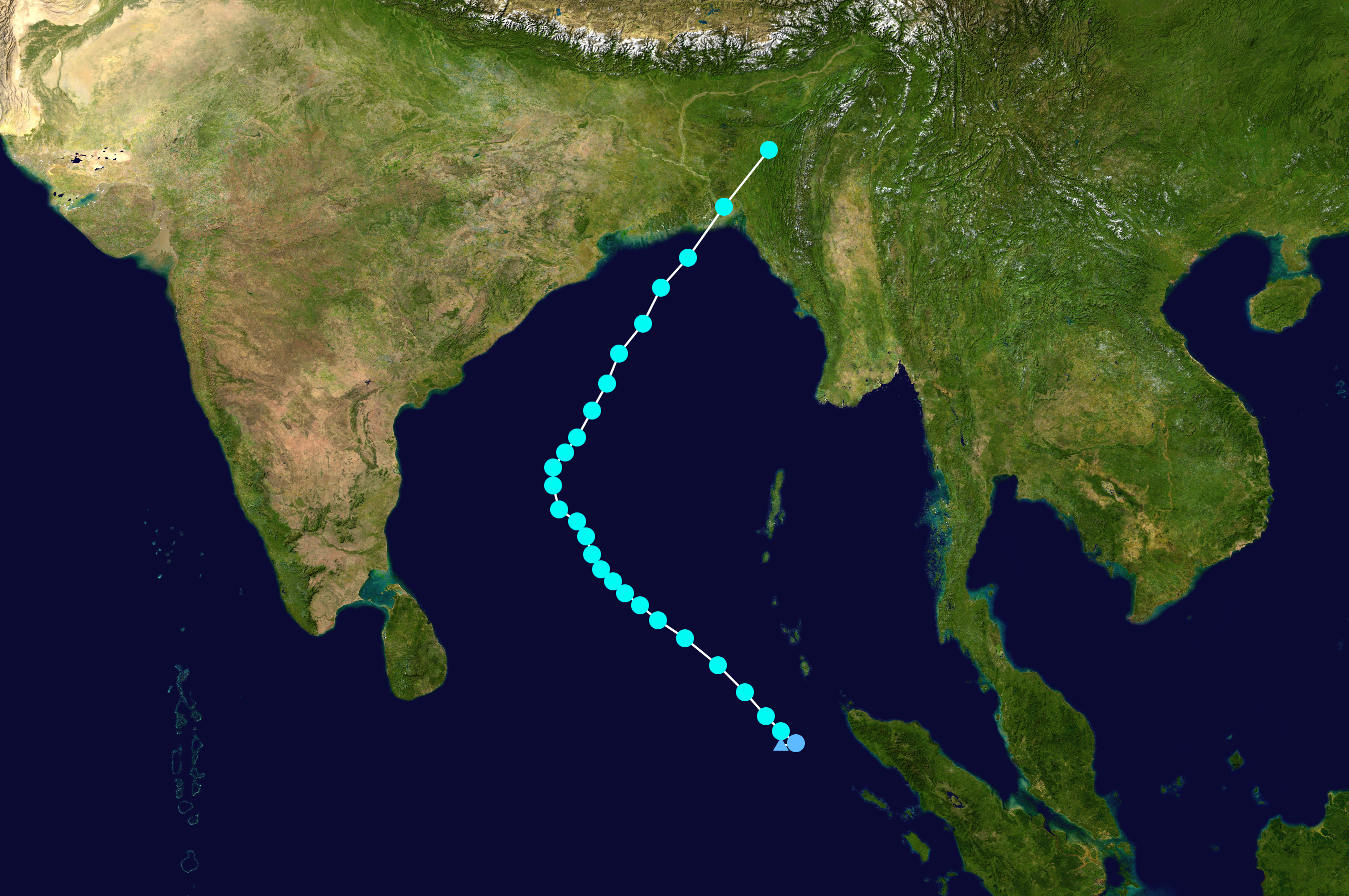
- Duration: May 10 – May 17
- Peak intensity: 85 km/h (50 mph) (3-min); 990 hPa (mbar)

Originating from an area of low pressure over the southern Bay of Bengal in early May 2013, Viyaru slowly consolidated into a depression on May 10. The depression gained forward momentum and attained gale-force winds on May 11 and was designated as Cyclonic Storm Viyaru, the first named storm of the season. Operationally, the system was referred to as Mahasen; however, this was altered in 2014 with the final report and all archived advisories changed to show Viyaru. (Note: The name Viyaru (Sinhala: වියරු, [ʋijaru]) was contributed by Sri Lanka and means "agitation, distress" in Sinhala. Operationally, the name Mahasen was used but was removed due to its controversial reference to a legendary king.) Owing to adverse atmospheric conditions, the depression struggled to maintain organized convection as it moved closer to eastern India. On May 14, the exposed circulation of Viyaru turned northeastward. The following day, conditions again allowed for the storm to intensify. Early on May 16, the cyclone attained its peak intensity with winds of 85 km/h (55 mph) and a barometric pressure of 990 mbar (hPa; 29.23 inHg). Shortly thereafter Viyaru made landfall near Chittagong, Bangladesh. On May 17, it moved over the eastern Indian state of Nagaland.

Early in the storm's existence, it brought flooding rains to much of northwestern Indonesia, resulting in significant damage. At least four people died and six others were reported missing. In preparation for the storm, large-scale evacuations were recommended for parts of Myanmar. This resulted with people overcrowding boats to escape, and one or several vessels capsized, causing at least 39 deaths; 42 people were rescued while 19 others were unaccounted for and feared dead. The storm's expansive cloud mass also brought unsettled weather to Sri Lanka, Thailand, and southeastern India. Severe storms in India and Sri Lanka were responsible for at least 16 fatalities and significant damage; one person died in Thailand. Striking Bangladesh in a weaker state than initially expected, damage was moderate to severe. A total of 95,003 poorly constructed huts were damaged or destroyed, 17 people died, and nearly 1.3 million were affected across the country. Losses to fisheries amounted to ৳12.87 billion (US$165 million). Myanmar was spared damage and further casualties.

=== Depression BOB 02 ===
- Depression (IMD)
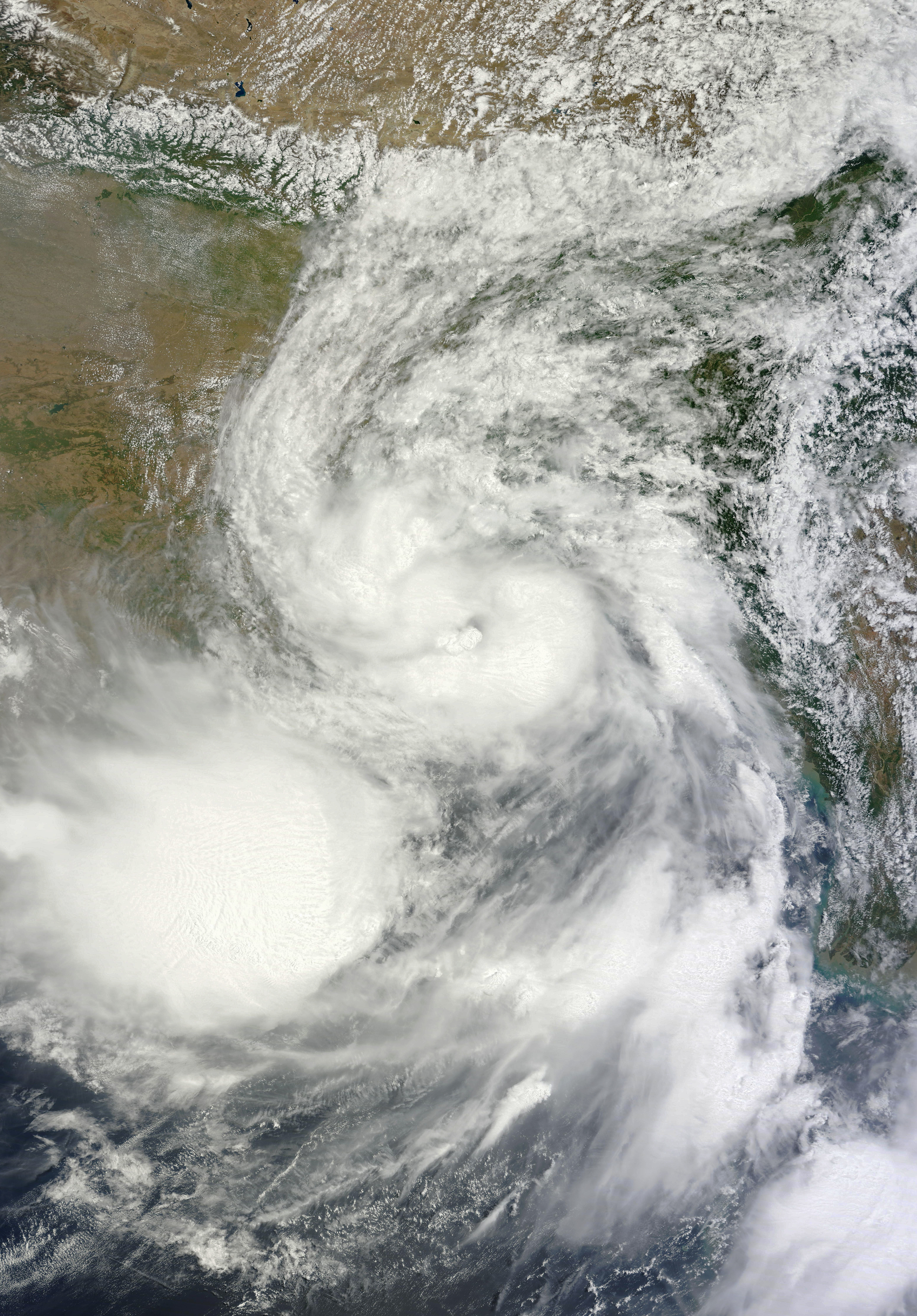
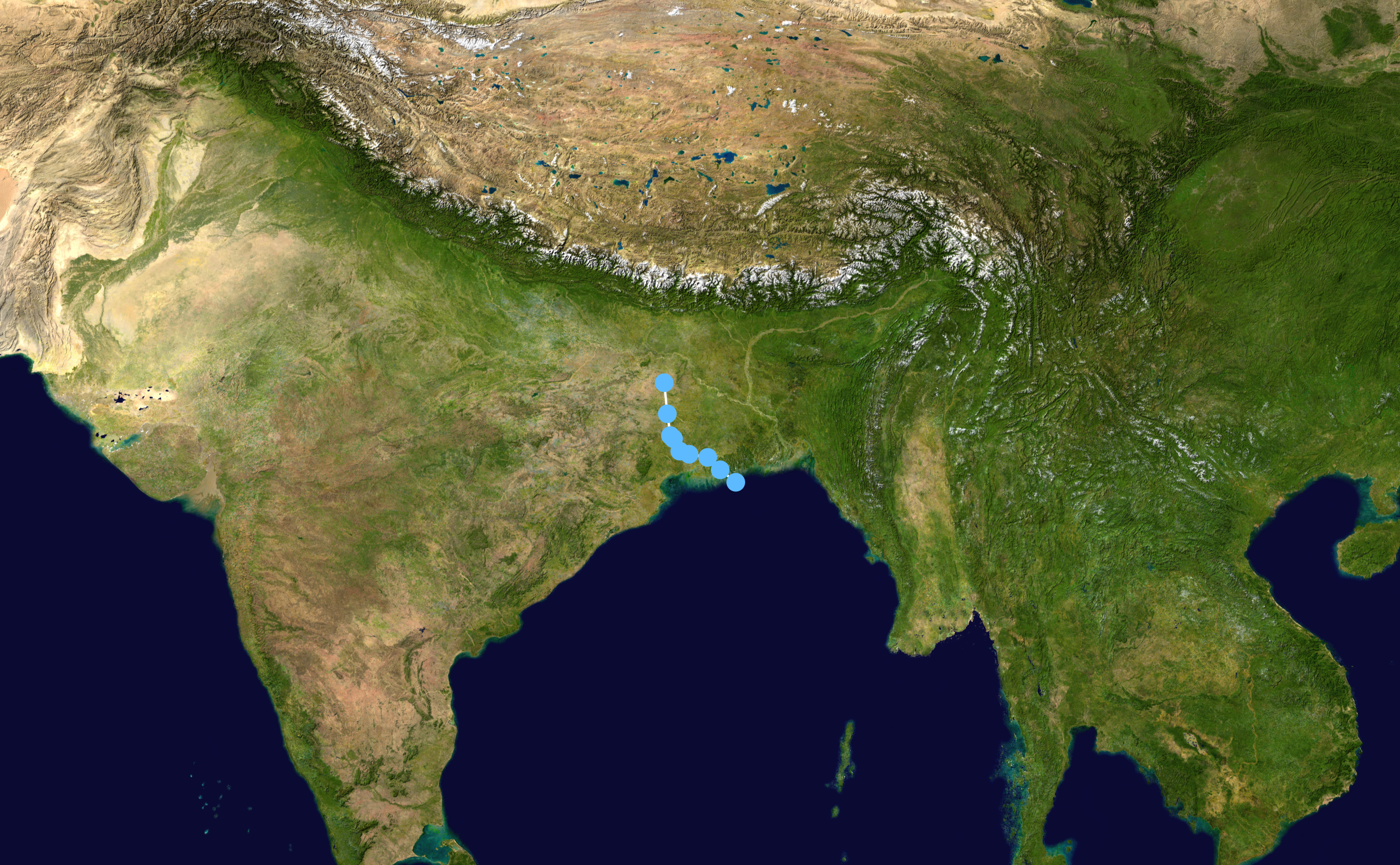
- Duration: May 29 – May 31
- Peak intensity: 45 km/h (30 mph) (3-min); 990 hPa (mbar)

An upper air cyclonic circulation developed into a low-pressure area on May 28. Favorable environmental conditions would cause the low to slowly organize, and on the early hours of May 29, it would intensify into a depression. Slightly intensifying thereafter, the storm took a northward track and crossed the West Bengal coast in the evening hours of the same day, with peak winds of 45 km/h (28 mph). The depression attained its minimum central pressure of 990 mbar (29 inHg) on May 30. Staying almost a day inland maintaining depression strength, it weakened gradually and dissipated over the states of Bihar and Jharkhand in the evening hours of May 31 due to land interaction and reduced moisture availability.

Contai in West Bengal received 260 mm of rainfall in 24 hours on May 30.

=== Depression BOB 03 ===
- Depression (IMD)
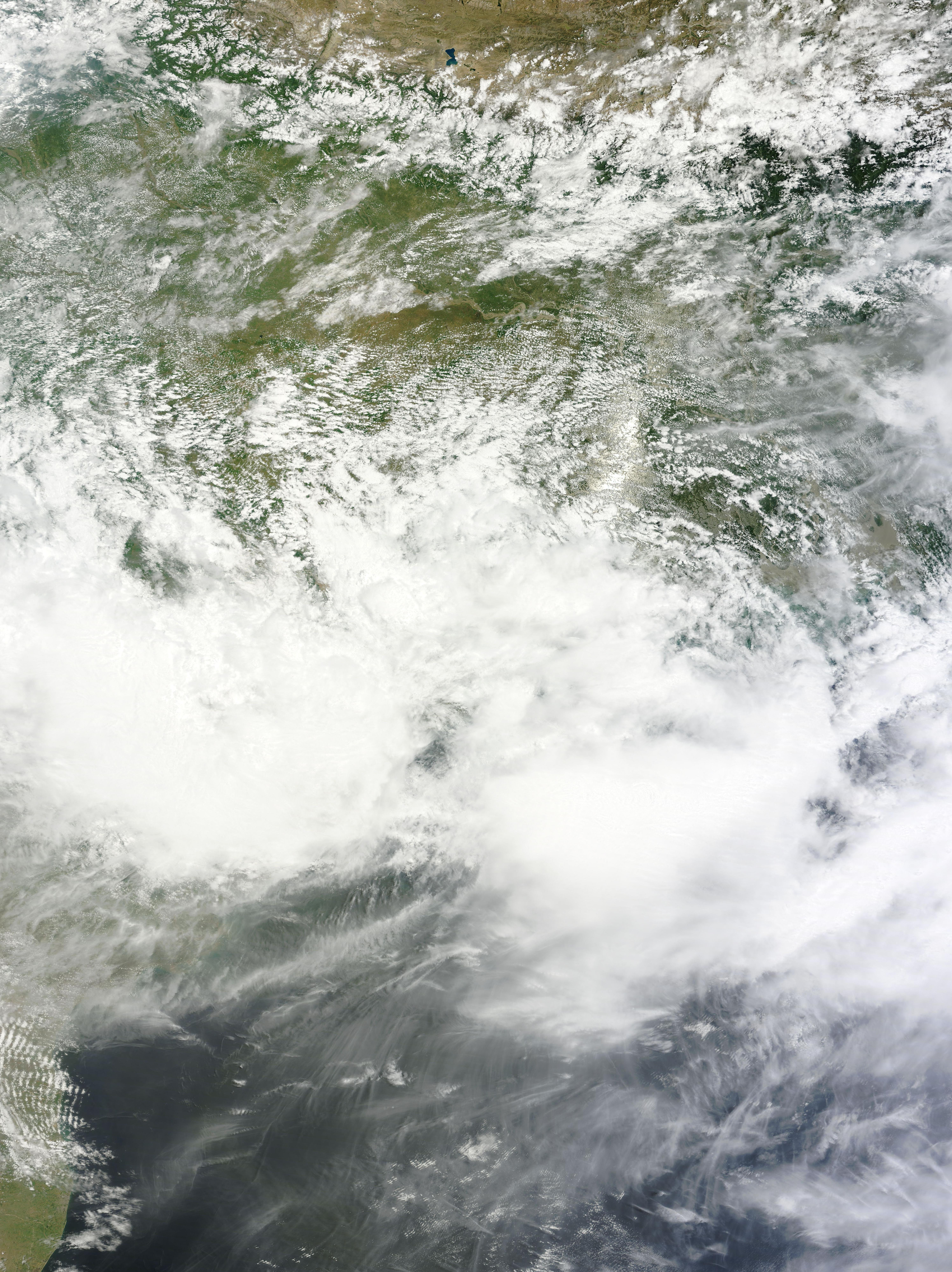
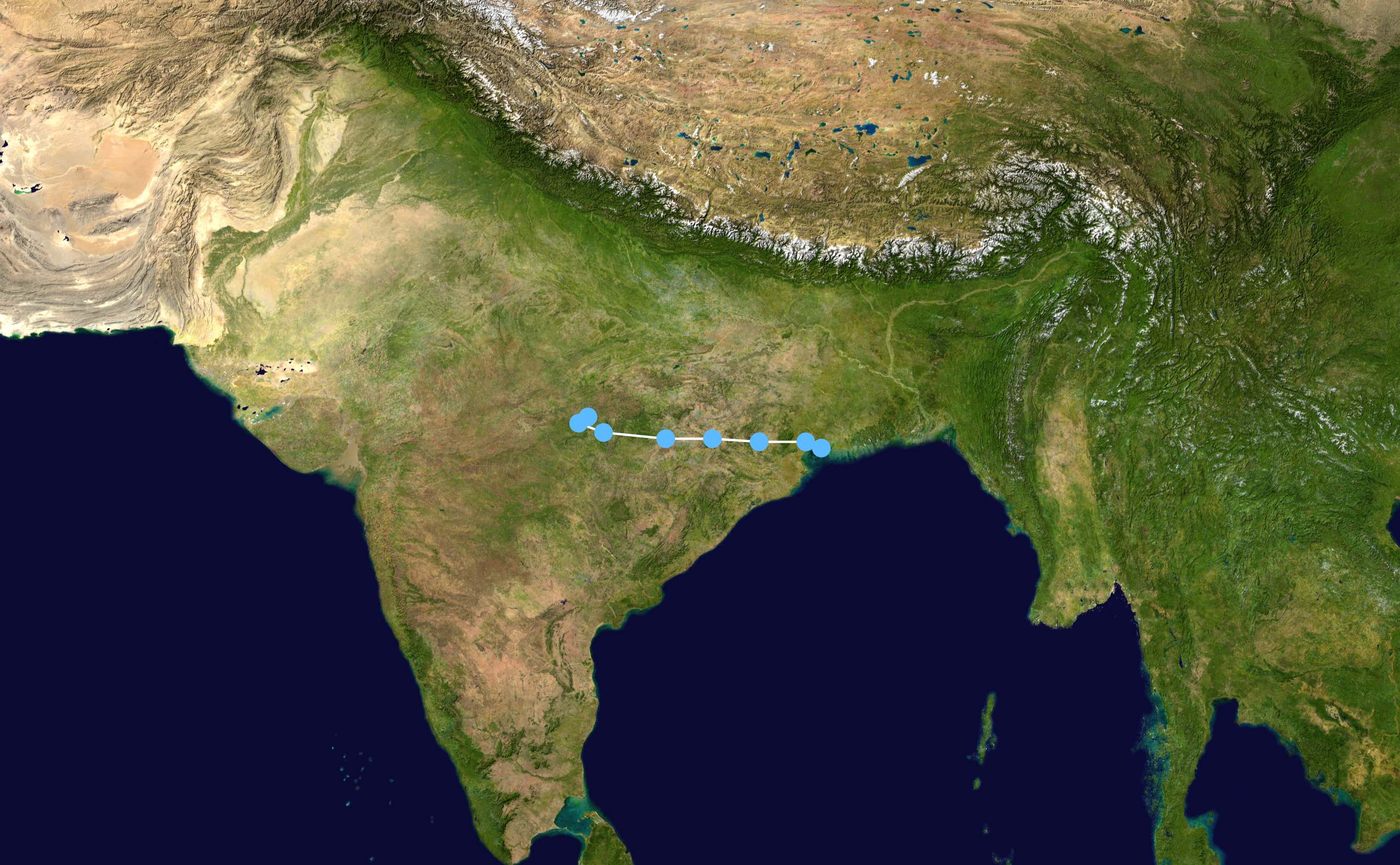
- Duration: July 30 – August 1
- Peak intensity: 45 km/h (30 mph) (3-min); 990 hPa (mbar)

A low-pressure area formed over the Bay of Bengal on July 29. It intensified gradually, and the IMD would classify the storm as a depression in the early hours of July 30. The system made landfall between Balasore, Odisha and Digha, West Bengal by the same evening at peak winds of 45 km/h (28 mph) and a minimum central pressure of 990 mbar (990 hPa). Spending a day inland, the depression weakened, degenerating into a well-marked low-pressure area on August 1 over the state of Madhya Pradesh in India.

The storm's precursor brought heavy rainfall to coastal Bangladesh. 30,000 people were marooned as a result of the following severe floods in Kalapara Upazila. In India, a Storm Warning Signal-3 was hoisted in the ports of Odisha, and fishermen were cautioned against venturing into the sea. Chicholi in Madhya Pradesh received 280 mm of rainfall in 24 hours due to the depression.

=== Depression LAND 01 ===
- Depression (IMD)
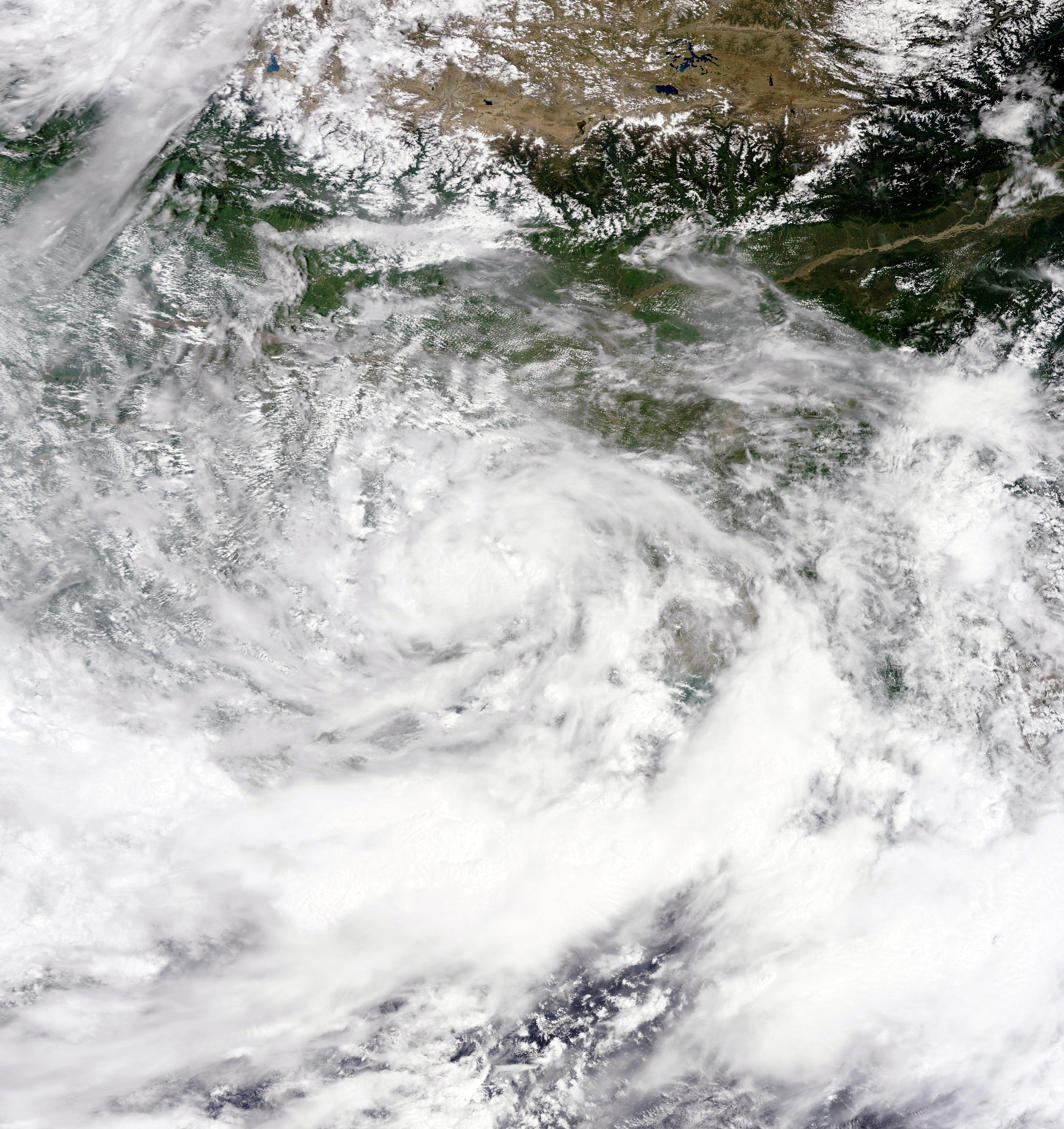
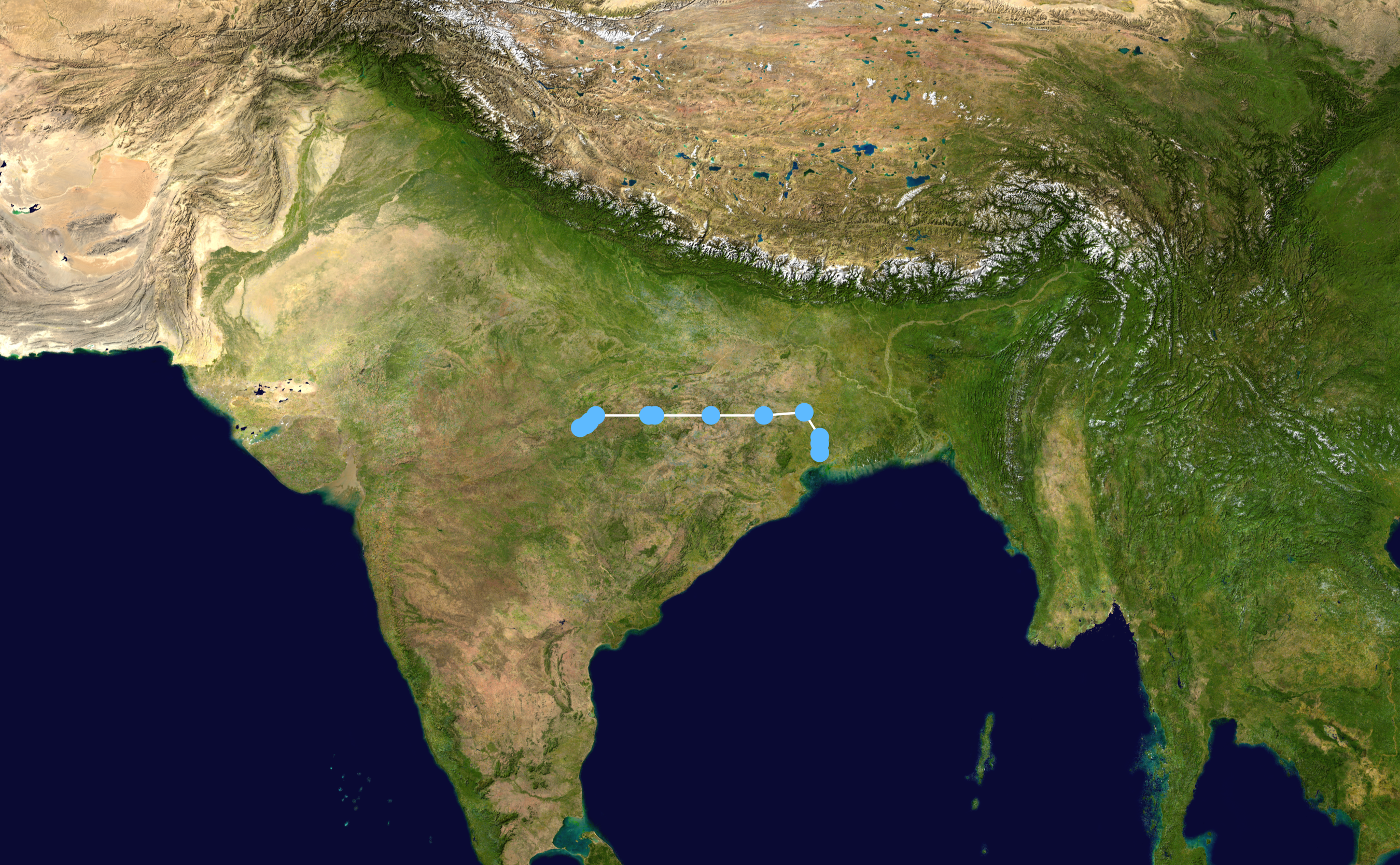
- Duration: August 20 – August 23
- Peak intensity: 45 km/h (30 mph) (3-min); 990 hPa (mbar)

A monsoonal low-pressure area formed over the Bay of Bengal on August 16. It gradually intensified, organizing itself into a Depression in the early hours of August 20 over coastal West Bengal and adjoining northern Odisha and Jharkhand. Over the next few days, the storm moved west-northwestward, before weakening into a well-marked low-pressure area on August 23.

The depression brought heavy rainfall to coastal West Bengal. Kolkata received 206 mm (8.1 in) of rainfall over a span of three days, the wettest spell of the monsoon season, causing flooding. At least four people were reported to have been killed across the state due to rain-related events. The system's precursor low caused authorities to raise cautionary signal number 3, at all maritime ports of Bangladesh. Pachmarhi in Madhya Pradesh received 500 mm (20 in) of rainfall in 72 hours.

=== Extremely Severe Cyclonic Storm Phailin ===
- Extremely severe cyclonic storm (IMD)
- Category 5 tropical cyclone (SSHWS)
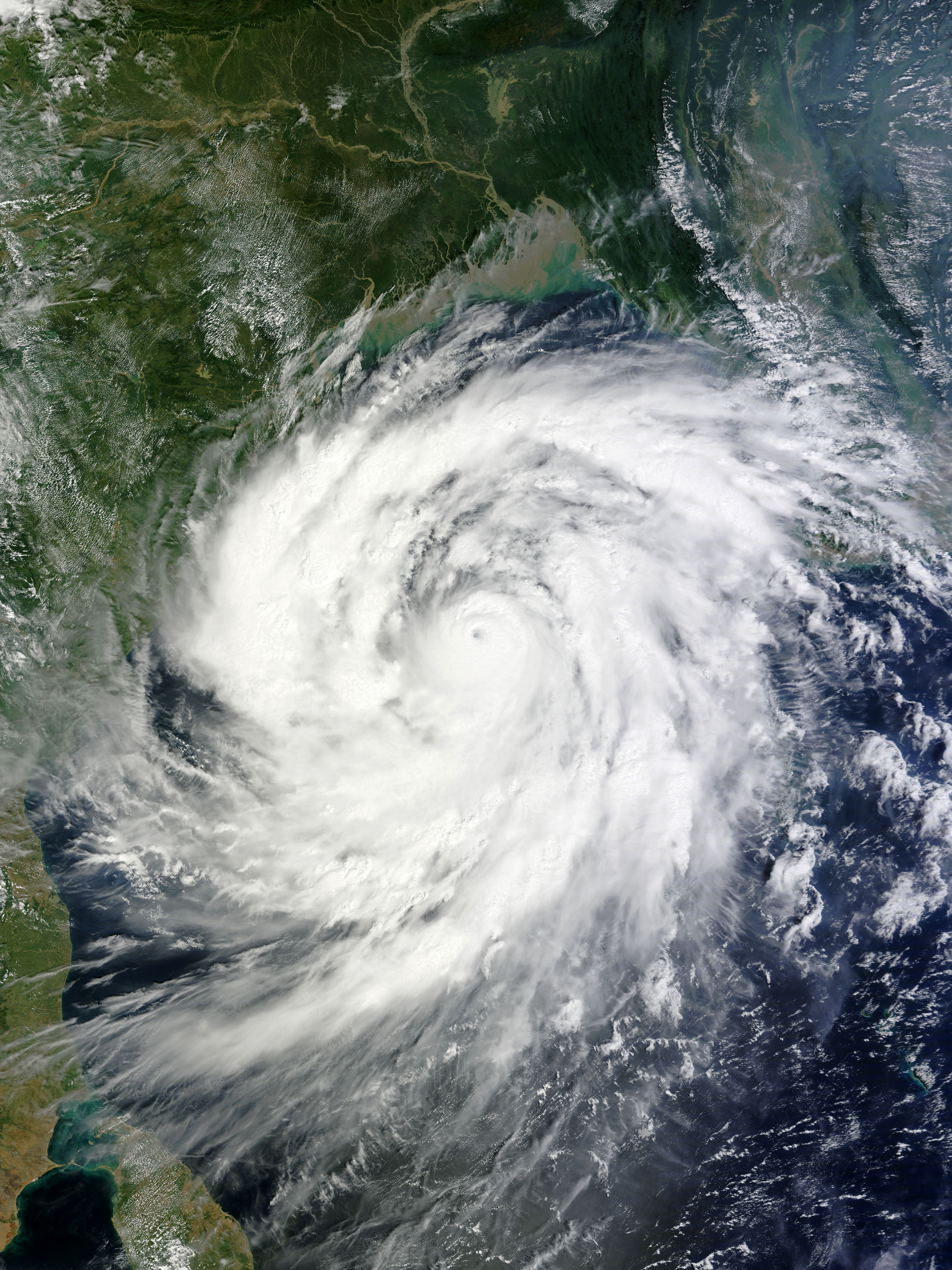
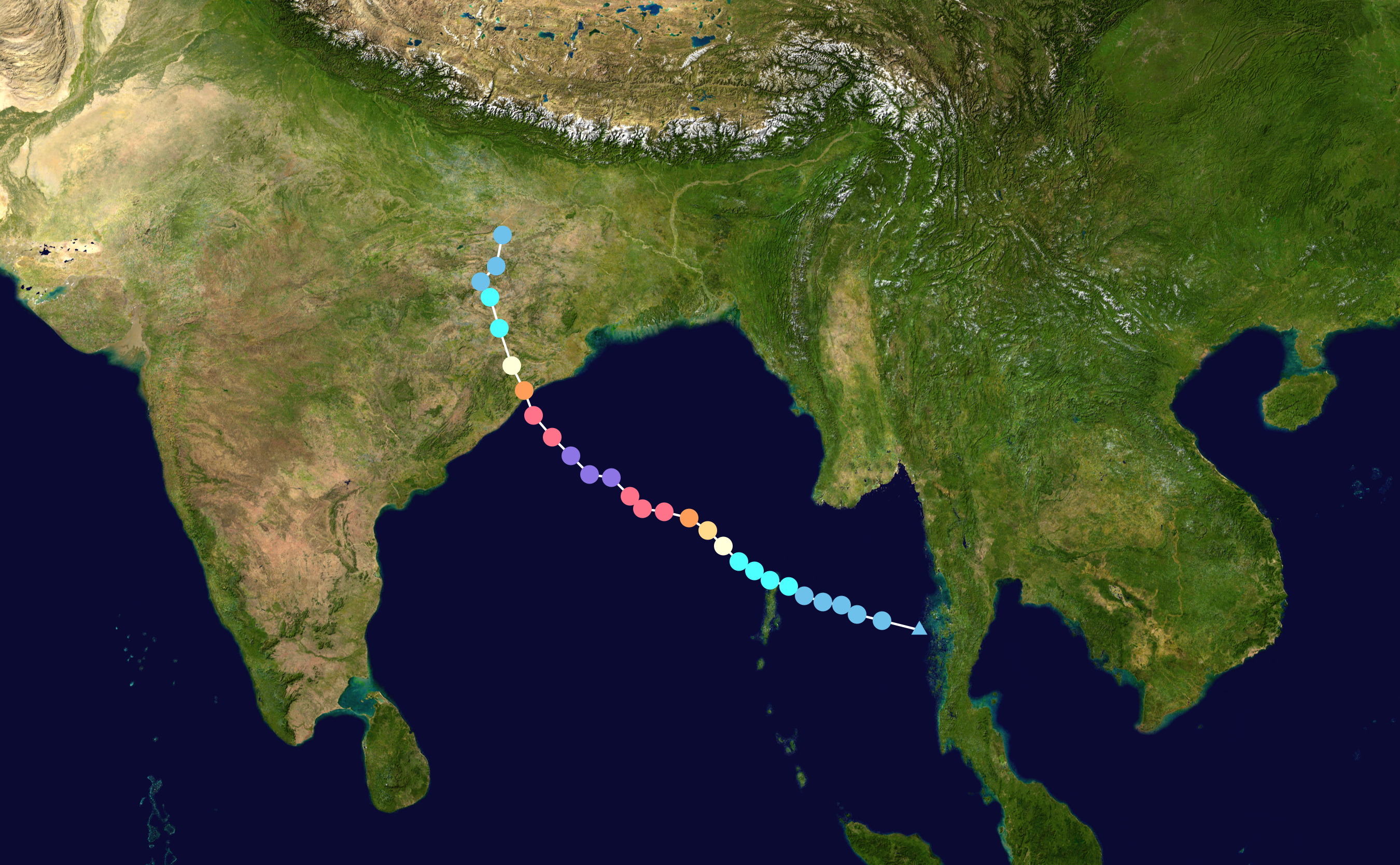
- Duration: October 6 (Entered basin) – October 14
- Peak intensity: 215 km/h (130 mph) (3-min); 940 hPa (mbar)

A tropical depression formed along the Gulf of Thailand on October 4. The tropical depression degenerated into a remnant low on October 6, as it crossed the 100th meridian on October 7. Under the influence of an upper air cyclonic circulation, it regenerated into a low-pressure area over the Andaman Sea and adjoining Tanintharyi region. It slowly organized itself and consolidated into a depression on October 8, followed by the Joint Typhoon Warning Center (JTWC) issuing a Tropical Cyclone Formation Alert (TCFA) the same day. In the early hours of October 9 the JTWC upgraded the storm to a tropical cyclone. The same day, the IMD upgraded the storm to a deep depression, and subsequently a cyclonic storm, naming it Phailin. (Note: The name Phailin (Thai: ไพลิน, [pʰaj˧ lin˧]) was contributed by Thailand and means "sapphire" in Thai.) Rapid intensification ensued, and Phailin strengthened into a Very Severe Cyclonic storm on October 10, followed by the JTWC upgrading the storm to a strong Category 4 status. Continuing its rapid intensification, the storm reached Category 5 status the following day, the first storm to do so in the North Indian Ocean since Cyclone Sidr in 2007. Shortly before landfall, Phailin began another eyewall replacement cycle which led to slight weakening, and the system jumped back to Category 4 status. Maintaining intensity, the storm made landfall close to Gopalpur, Odisha in the evening of October 12. Phailin rapidly weakened as it tracked over rugged terrain, eventually dissipating into a well marked low-pressure area over the state of Bihar on October 14.

It resembled an annular cyclone structure, and to have reached Category 5 SSHWS after 1999 BOB 06 (05B JTWC). Though the eyewall replacement devolved the symmetric structure.

The cyclone prompted India's biggest evacuation in 23 years with more than 550,000 people moving up from the coastline in Odisha and Andhra Pradesh to safer places. 44 deaths related to the cyclone were reported.

=== Deep Depression ARB 01 ===
- Deep depression (IMD)
- Tropical storm (SSHWS)
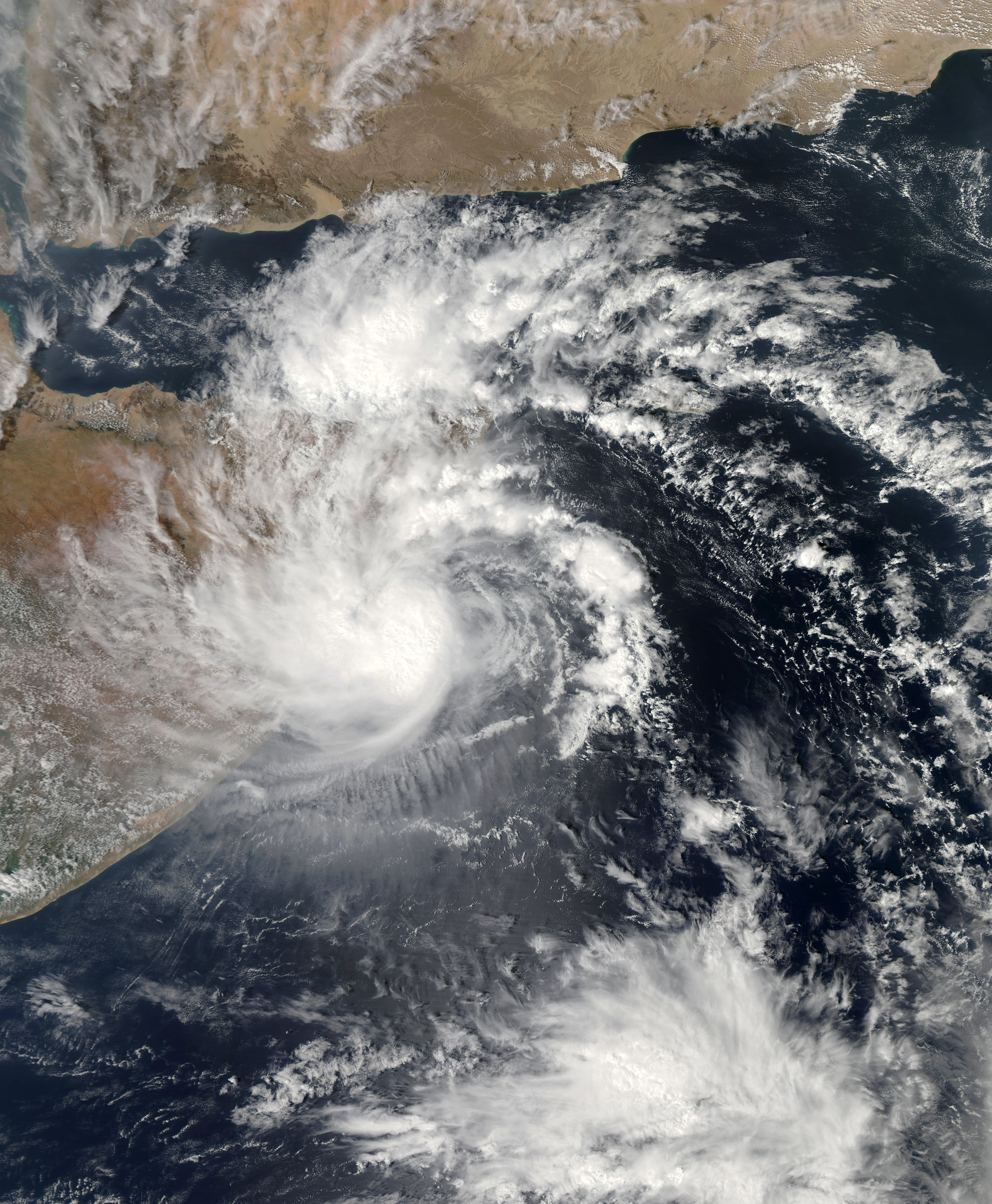
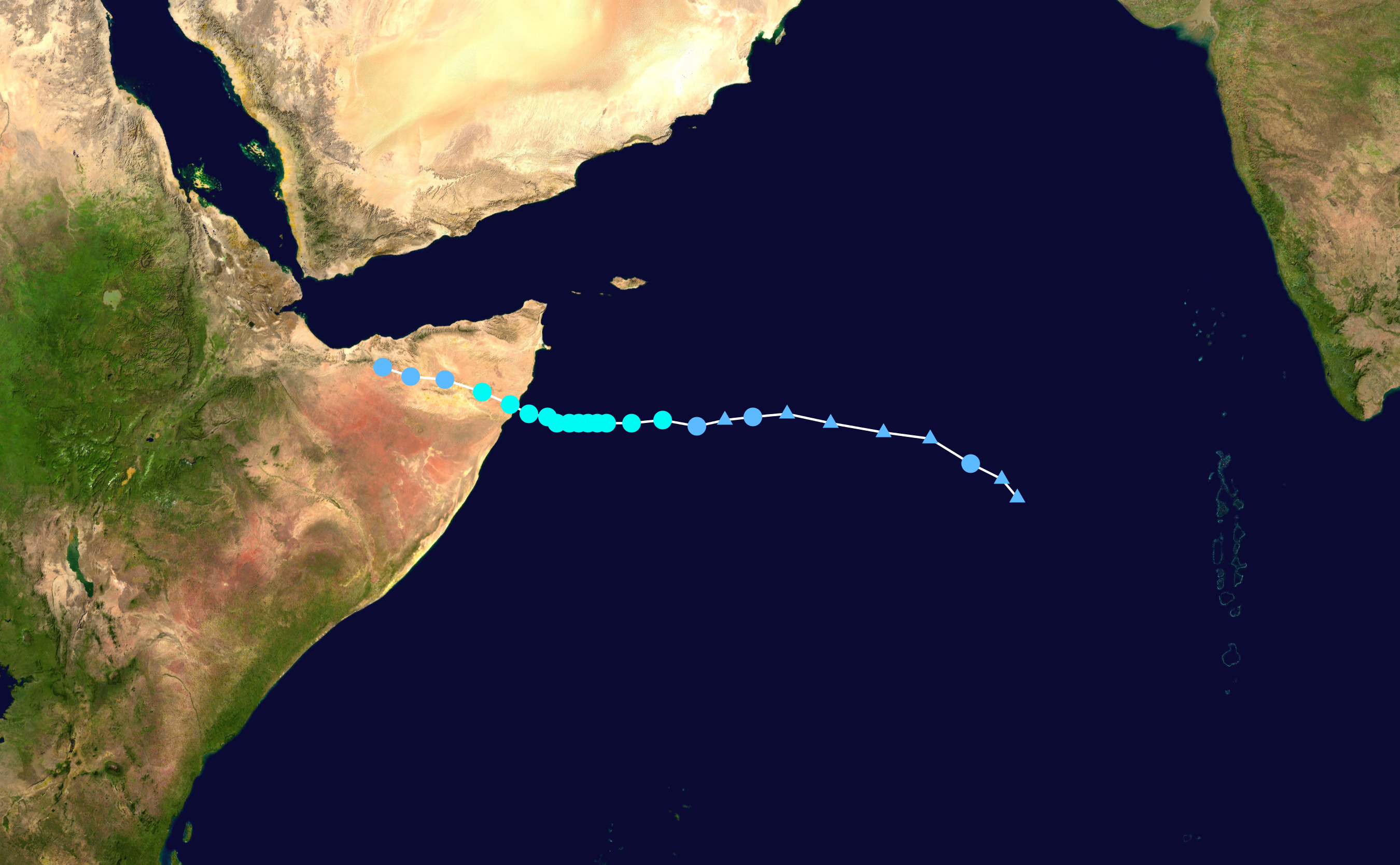
- Duration: November 8 – November 11
- Peak intensity: 55 km/h (35 mph) (3-min); 1002 hPa (mbar)

In early November, a low-pressure area formed over the Arabian Sea. It slowly moved westwards and consolidated into Depression ARB 01 on November 8. The JTWC issued a Tropical Cyclone Formation Alert the same day, reporting that the depression was moving into an area favorable for further intensification. The next morning, the IMD upgraded the storm to a deep depression; the JTWC similarly upgraded the system to a tropical storm following reports of 65 km/h (40 mph) winds near the storm's center of circulation. Remaining stationary for nearly a day, the storm crossed the coast of Somalia early on November 11. The system rapidly deteriorated due to land interaction, and both the JTWC and the IMD issued their final warnings on the system later that day.

ARB 01 made landfall in the northeastern Puntland region on November 9, and dissipated by the 11th. Around 300 fatalities were reported in the wake of the storm, as well as livestock casualties and damaged infrastructure. Much of the damage was averted by an early administrative response overseen by the Puntland Disaster Management and Rescue committee, which coordinated relief efforts by the Puntland Maritime Police Force, governmental rescue teams, and the Puntland Highway Authority.

=== Depression BOB 05 ===
- Depression (IMD)
- Tropical storm (SSHWS)
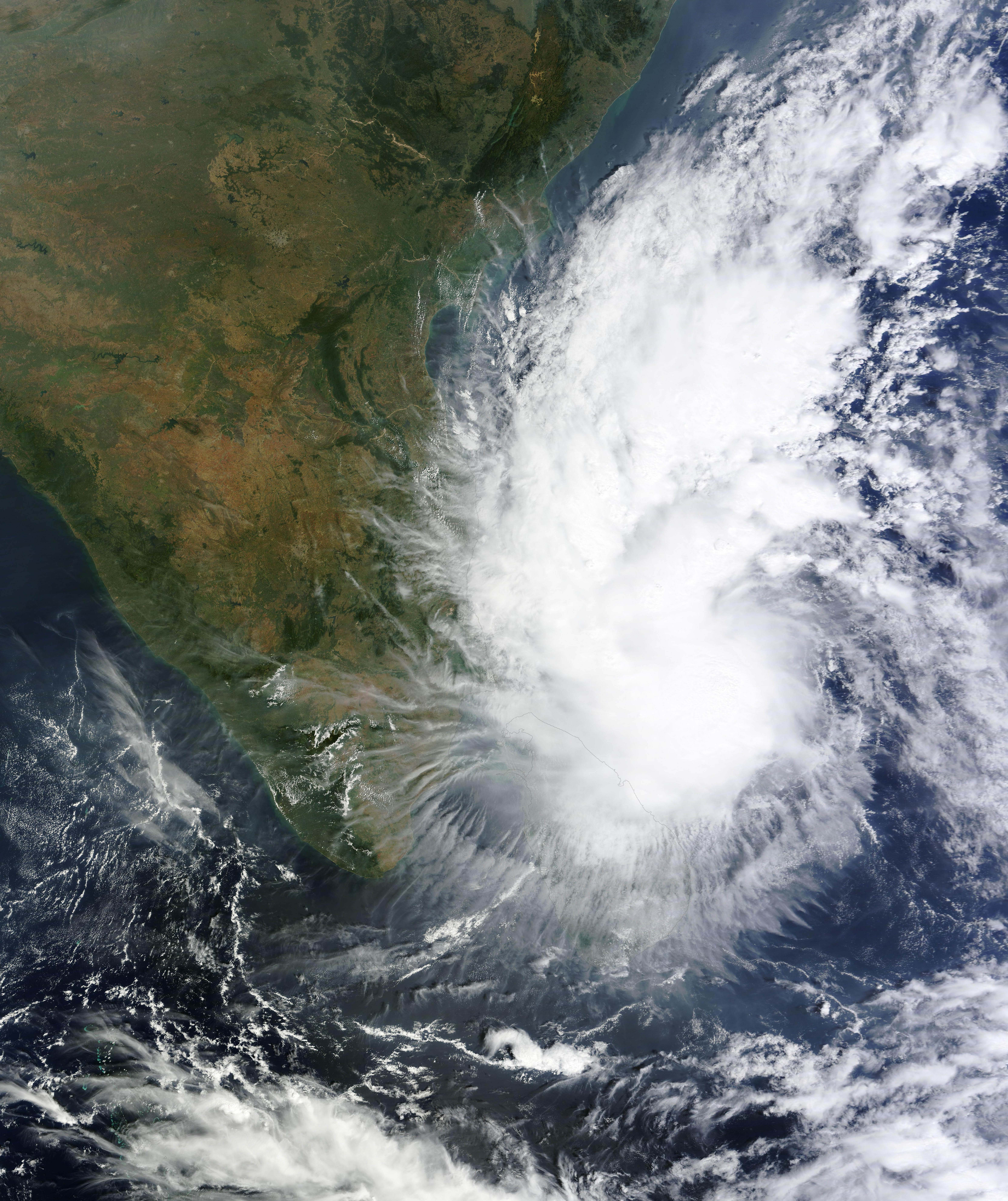
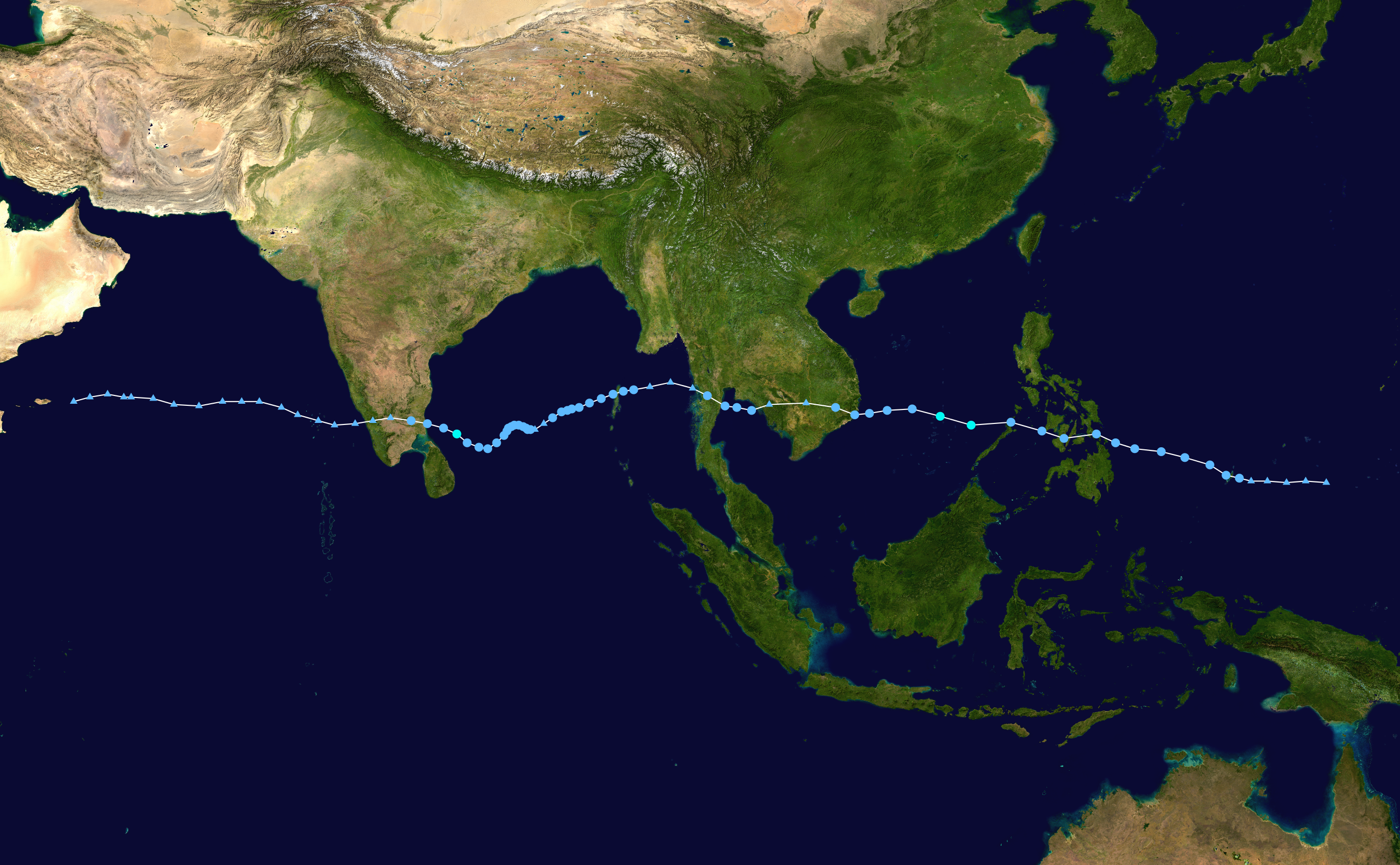
- Duration: November 13 – November 17
- Peak intensity: 45 km/h (30 mph) (3-min); 1003 hPa (mbar)

On November 8, the remnants of Tropical Depression 30W (Wilma) crossed the Malay Peninsula, and emerged into the eastern Bay of Bengal. During the next several days, the system drifted towards the west while weakening further. On November 12, the system began to reorganize gradually, while continuing to move westwards. On November 13, the system was classified as a depression by the IMD, and given the identifier BOB 05. The depression maintained its intensity despite passing through an environment unfavorable for intensification, and was re-upgraded to tropical cyclone intensity by the JTWC on November 15. Shortly before landfall, the system weakened due to land interaction, and the JTWC issued its final warning. On November 16, BOB 05 made landfall near Nagapattinam, Tamil Nadu, and the system quickly began to weaken. Later on November 16, the IMD issued its final advisory on Depression BOB 05, as the system weakened into a well-marked area of low pressure. Over the next several hours, the remnant low of BOB 05 moved across the central part of Southern India, and the system continued to weaken. During the next several days, BOB 05 moved westwards across the Arabian Sea as a convectionless low. Later, the remnants of BOB 05 redeveloped a small amount of convection, while continuing to moved westwards. Late on November 21, the remnants of BOB 05 turned to the southwest, affecting Socotra Island on November 22. Early on November 23, the remnants of Depression BOB 05 dissipated just south of Socotra Island.

Heavy rains along with 60 km/h winds lashed many parts of the state of Tamil Nadu. Mayiladuthurai, a town in Nagapattinam district, experienced the highest rainfall, amounting to 220 mm. 13 people were killed as the Depression crossed the state's coast.

=== Severe Cyclonic Storm Helen ===
- Severe cyclonic storm (IMD)
- Category 1 tropical cyclone (SSHWS)
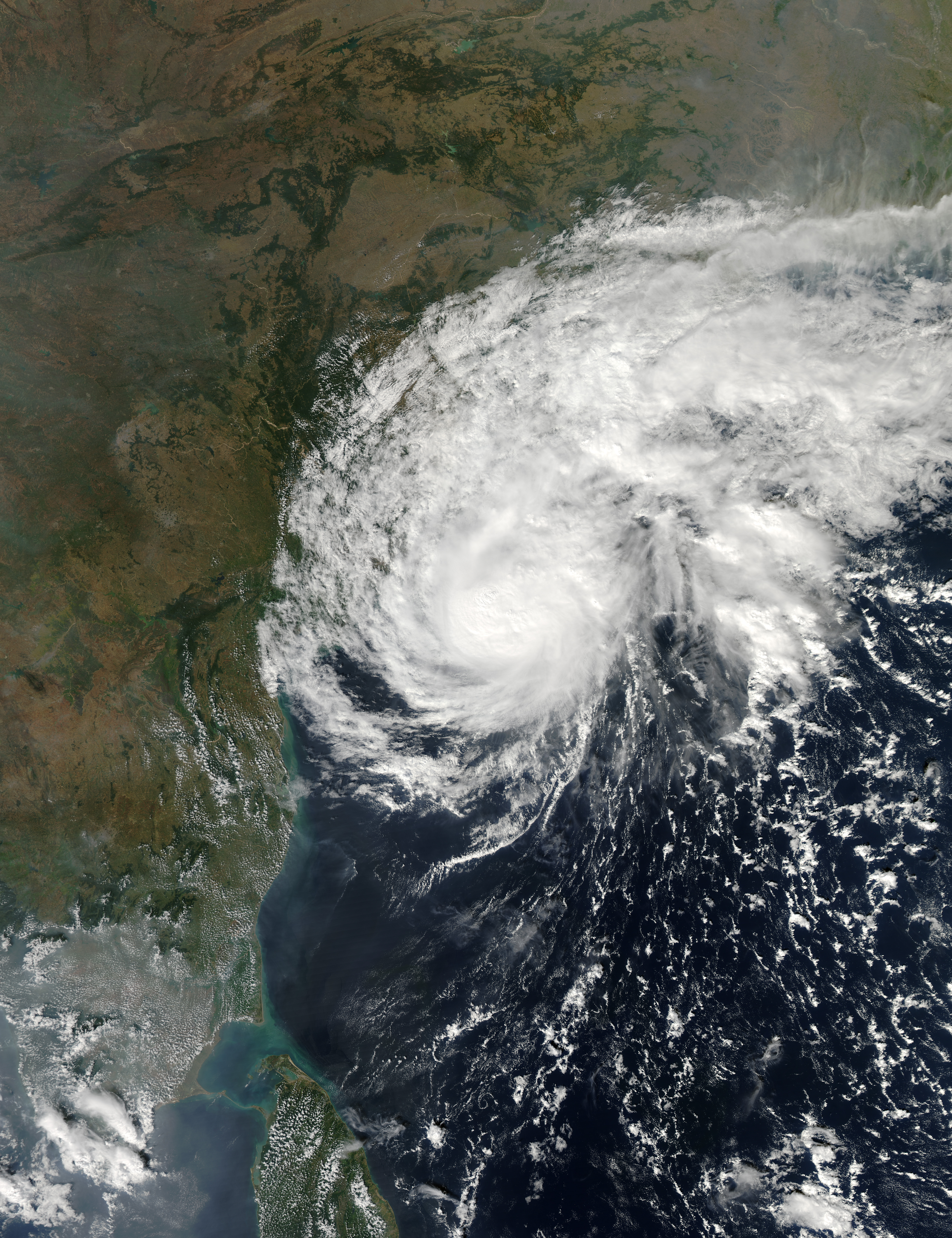
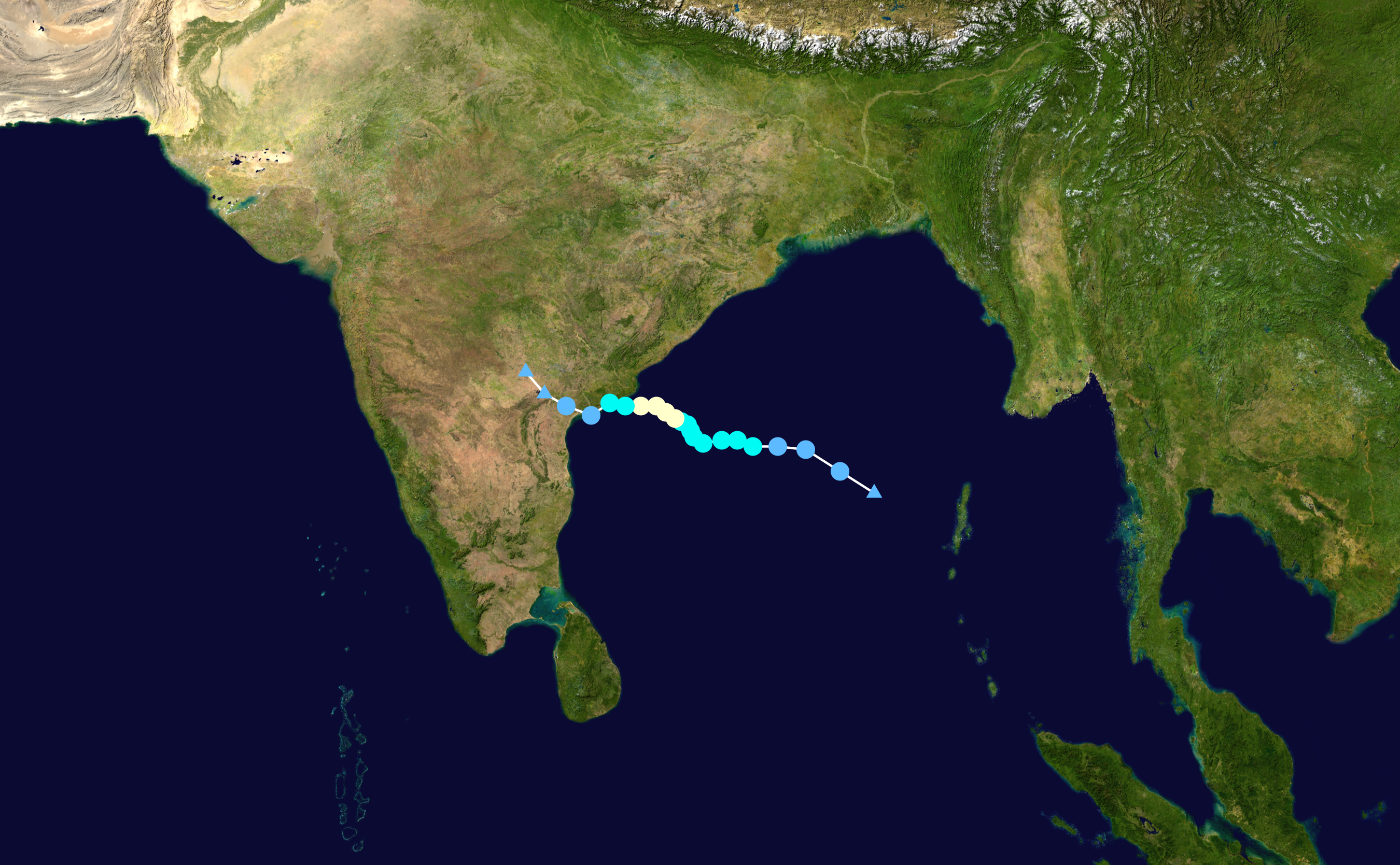
- Duration: November 19 – November 23
- Peak intensity: 100 km/h (65 mph) (3-min); 990 hPa (mbar)

Late on November 17, the remnant energy of Tropical Storm Podul contributed to the development of a trough over the Bay of Bengal, located near the Andaman Islands. During the next couple of days, the storm slowly organized and consolidated, prompting the Joint Typhoon Warning Center (JTWC) to issue a Tropical Cyclone Formation Alert (TCFA) during the early hours of November 19. Later on the same day, the India Meteorological Department (IMD) upgraded the storm to a depression, classifying it as BOB 06, followed by the JTWC reporting that the storm had reached Tropical Storm strength. A couple of hours later, the IMD upgraded BOB 06 into a Deep Depression, as the storm continued to intensify.

The storm slowly drifted west-northwestward while deep convection consolidated around the system's well-defined center of circulation. In the early hours of November 20, the IMD classified BOB 06 as a Cyclonic Storm, thereby officially naming it Helen. (Note: The name Helen (Bengali: হেলেন, [hɛlɛn]) was contributed by Bangladesh and possibly refers to Helen of Troy in Bengali.) Helen continued to intensify into a Severe Cyclonic Storm the following day, reaching its peak intensity of 100 km/h (62 mph) with a central pressure of 990 mbar (29 inHg). Shortly before landfall, the storm's convection sheared to the north, causing its low level circulation to fully expose followed by the JTWC issuing its final bulletin, reporting that the storm had weakened due to land interaction. Helen made landfall south of Machilipatnam, Andhra Pradesh and rapidly deteriorated into a deep depression. It was last noted as a low-pressure area on November 23. A total of 11 deaths were reported in incidents related to the cyclone.

=== Very Severe Cyclonic Storm Lehar ===
- Very severe cyclonic storm (IMD)
- Category 1 tropical cyclone (SSHWS)
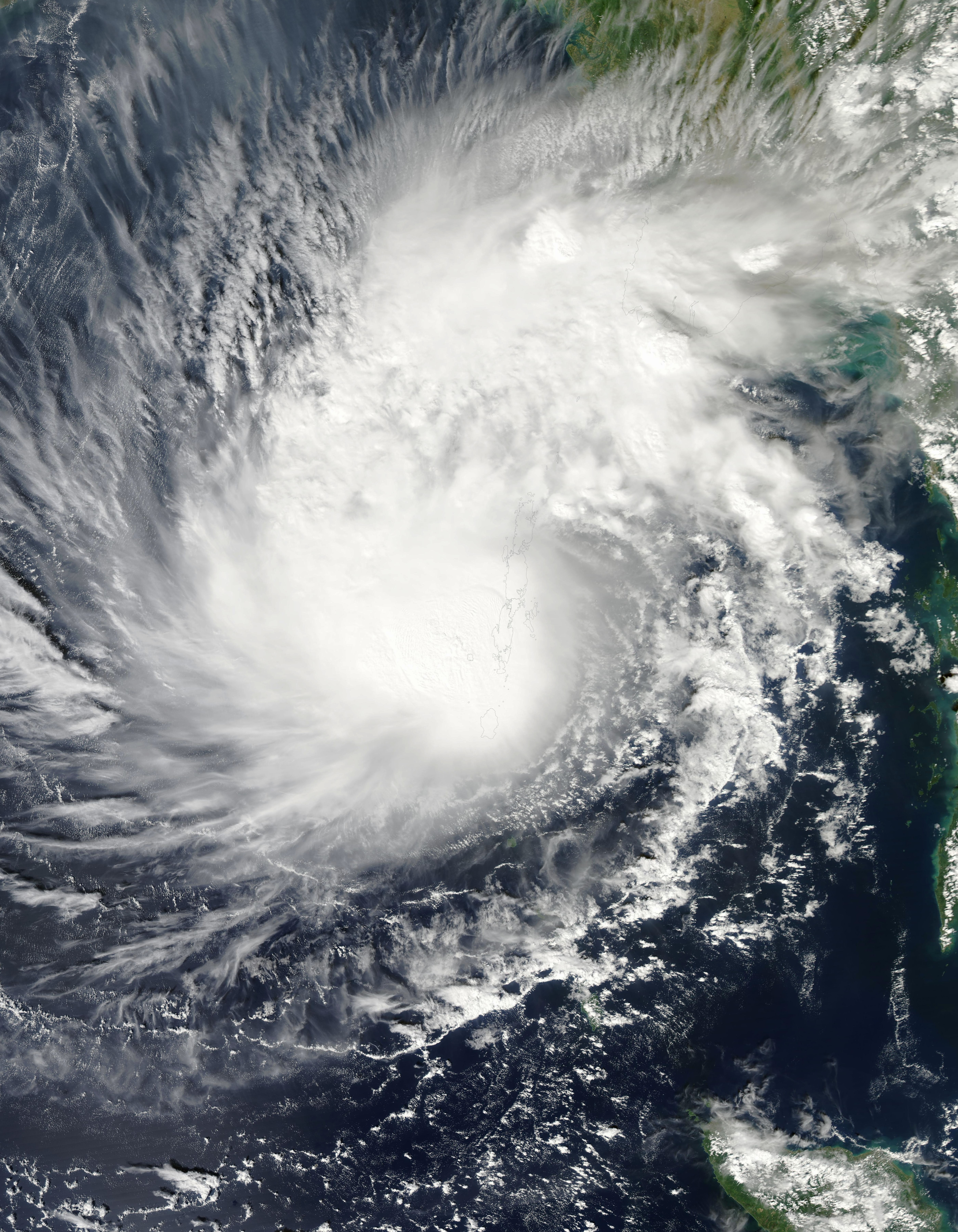
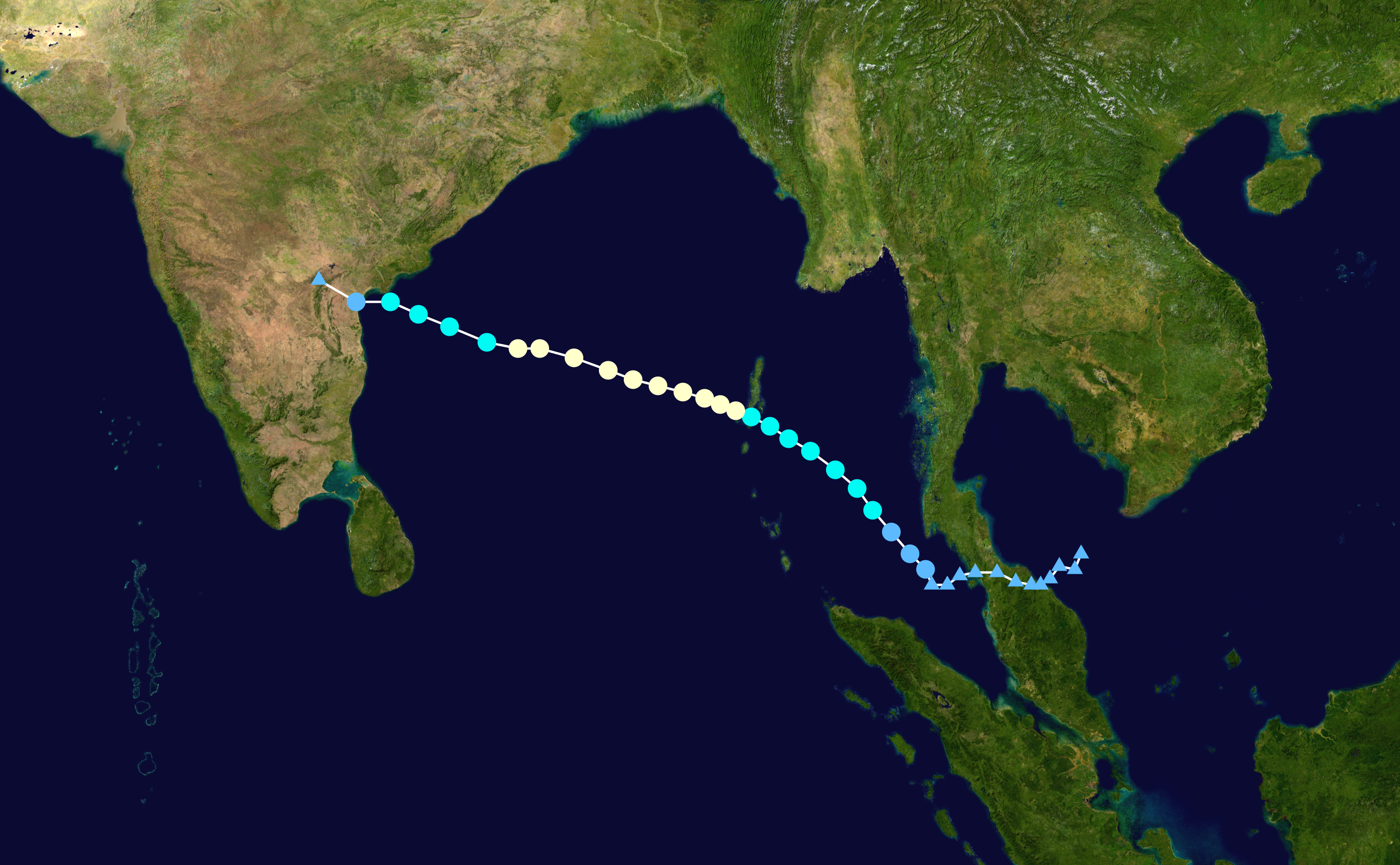
- Duration: November 23 (Entered basin) – November 28
- Peak intensity: 140 km/h (85 mph) (3-min); 980 hPa (mbar)

A low-pressure area formed over the South China Sea on November 18. It was then classified as a tropical depression later that day. It weakened into a low-pressure area on November 22 as it crossed the Isthmus of Kra and entered the Andaman Sea. It then gradually intensified, and the JTWC classified the system as a tropical depression on November 23. Later on the same day, the storm was upgraded into Depression BOB 07 by the IMD, while the JTWC upgraded the system into a tropical storm. The following day, the BOB 07 strengthened further into a cyclonic storm, and the IMD assigned it the name Lehar. (Note: The name Lehar (Hindi: लहर, [lɛ.ɦɛɾ]) was contributed by India and means "wave" in Hindi.) On November 25, the storm gradually consolidated further and was upgraded to a severe cyclonic storm by the IMD, while the JTWC reported that the storm had reached Category 1 status in the SSHS hurricane scale. The following day, Lehar further intensified into a very severe cyclonic storm, as both IMD and JTWC reported peak winds of 140 km/h (87 mph) and a central pressure of 982 mbar (29.0 inHg). Early on November 27, the JTWC reported the storm's low-level circulation center (LLCC) was losing its structure due to vertical wind shear, indicating a weakening trend. Thereafter, Lehar rapidly weakened into a depression and made landfall near Machilipatnam on November 28. Land interaction led to the degeneration of the storm into a well-marked low-pressure area, while it moved inland.

The cyclone affected the Andaman Islands with heavy rain and strong winds. It caused flooding, landslides, road blockage, uprooting of trees and damage to buildings. More than two dozen fishermen went missing and almost all of them were rescued by the Coast Guard and police. In Little Andaman, more than 2000 people were evacuated and kept in Onge-tikrey community hall there. In nearby Havelock Island, about 1500 people sought shelter in the Panchayat community hall. Mayabander and Port Blair recorded 24-hour rainfall accumulations of 243 mm and 213 mm respectively as the cyclone made landfall. Four flights originating from Chennai bound to Port Blair were cancelled due to the cyclone on November 25 while 110 km/h (68 mph) winds lashed the islands.

=== Very Severe Cyclonic Storm Madi ===
- Very severe cyclonic storm (IMD)
- Category 2 tropical cyclone (SSHWS)
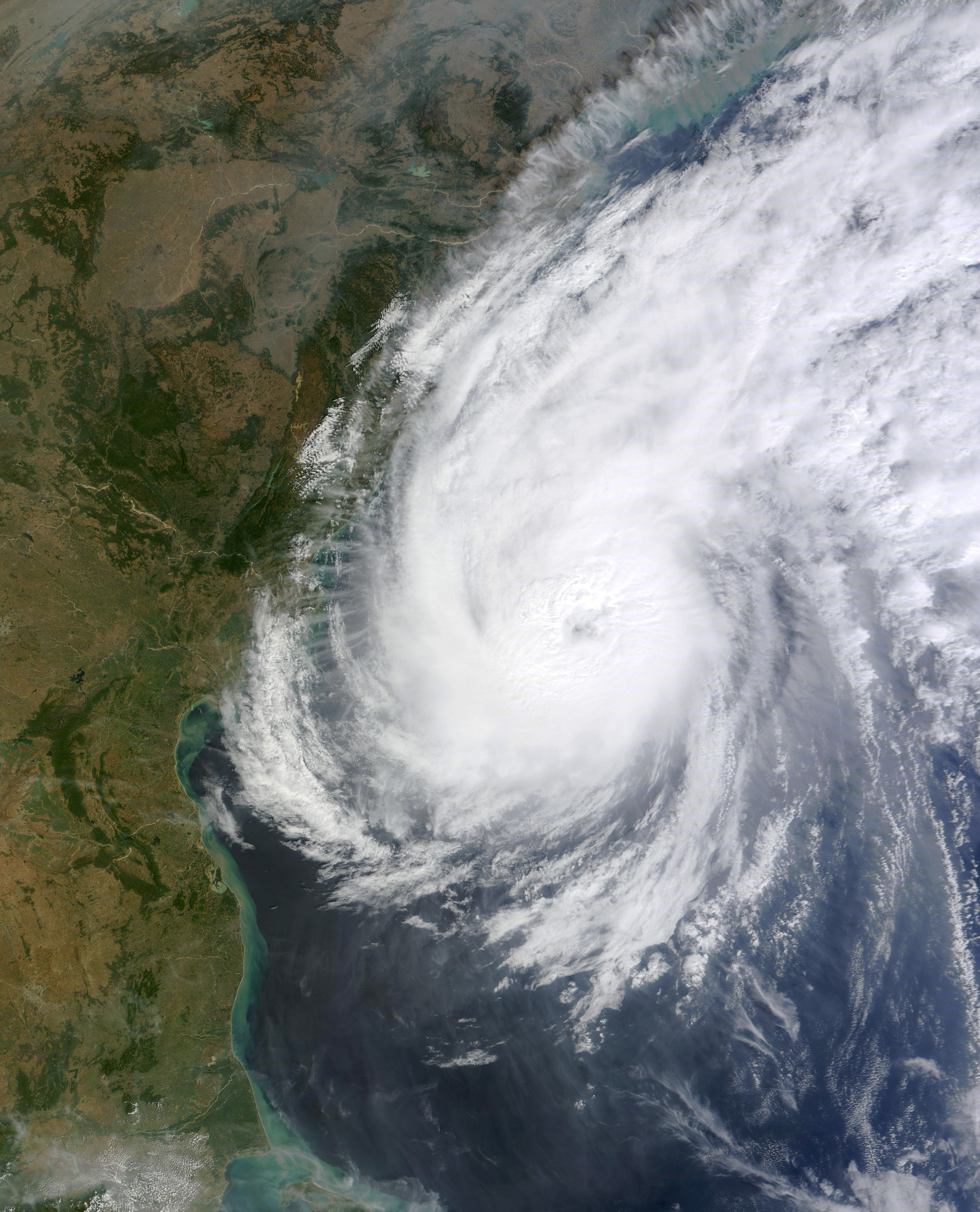
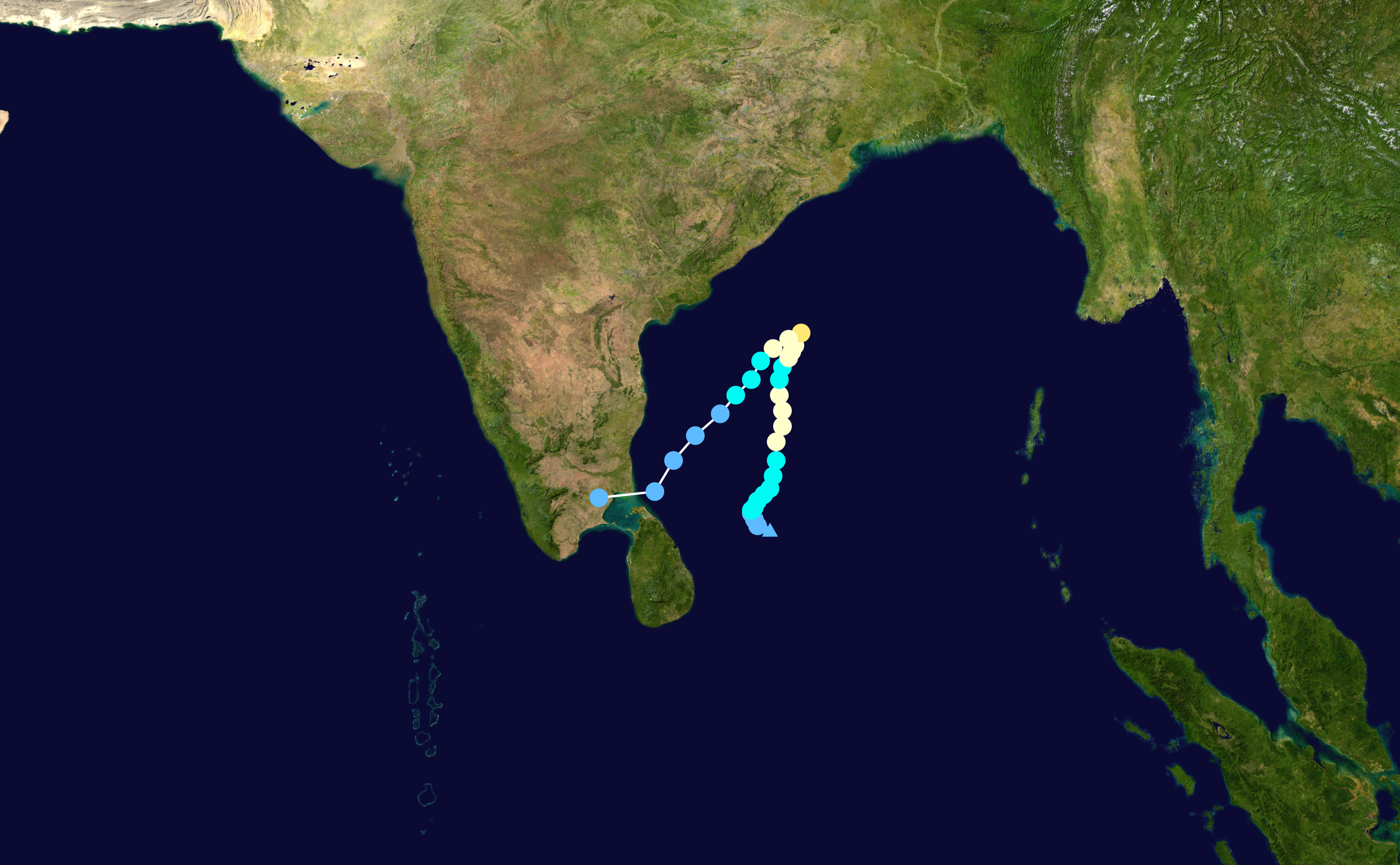
- Duration: December 6 – December 13
- Peak intensity: 120 km/h (75 mph) (3-min); 986 hPa (mbar)

On November 30, a low-pressure area formed south of India close to the equator. A day later, microwave satellite imagery revealed a broad low-level circulation center (LLCC). The system slowly drifted northeastward over the next couple of days and slowly intensified. Though the sea surface temperatures were good enough for tropical cyclogenesis, moderate vertical wind shear kept the system from strengthening too quickly. On December 5, the JTWC issued a TCFA on the system. The following day, the storm strengthened further, and the JTWC initiated advisories on the system, designating it as "06B". Around the same time, the IMD started tracking this system as Depression BOB 08. The storm remained nearly stationary over the next 24 hours. Early on December 7, the IMD further upgraded BOB 08 into a Deep Depression, and later upgrading it to Cyclonic Storm Madi about 370 km (230 mi) from Trincomalee, Sri Lanka. (Note: The name Madi (Dhivehi: މަޑި, [mäɖi]) was contributed by the Maldives and means "stingray" in Dhivehi.)

Tracking slowly north-northwestward under the influence of a deep shortwave trough, the storm quickly intensified into a severe cyclonic storm. Madi accelerated slightly while maintaining a large area of convection. By December 8, Madi had developed an excellent poleward outflow, with deep convection wrapped into a well-defined center. Both the JTWC and IMD were reporting winds of 65 knots (120 km/h; 75 mph) at the center. With this, the IMD upgraded Madi to a Very Severe Cyclonic Storm, the third in 2013. However, Madi moved into an area of increasing vertical wind shear, causing weakening. Madi's poleward track was explained by the strong subtropical ridge located to the east of the system. On December 9, the IMD reported that Madi had weakened into a Severe Cyclonic storm. Despite the wind shear, Madi developed an eye on December 10, and the JTWC assessed the system as a Category 1 equivalent for a second time. Against all expectations, the storm continued to track in a northerly direction, until later that day, when it made a sharp, sudden, southwestward turn. Madi started losing all its convection to the strong wind shear. Another subtropical ridge located over India had steered the system southwestward. On December 11, Madi's LLCC became clearly exposed after dry air wrapped around the southern part of the system. This weakened Madi into a Cyclonic Storm, and later into a deep depression. Overnight, Madi weakened further into a depression and crossed the Tamil Nadu coast close to Vedaranyam around 1330 UTC on December 12, 2013. It then emerged into the Palk Strait at 1530 UTC and crossed the Tamil Nadu coast again near Thondi at 1700 UTC on the same day. Colachel in Kanyakumari district of Tamil Nadu got the highest rainfall of 115 mm in 24 hours on December 13.

== Storm names ==
In the basin, a tropical cyclone is assigned a name whe is judged to have become a cyclonic storm with winds of 65 kilometres per hour (40 mph). The names were selected by members of the ESCAP/WMO Panel on Tropical Cyclones from 2000 and May 2004, before the Regional Specialized Meteorological Center in New Delhi started to assign names in September 2004. There is no retirement of tropical cyclone names in this basin as the list of names is only scheduled to be used once before a new list of names is drawn up. Should a named tropical cyclone move into the basin from the Western Pacific, it will retain its original name. The next eight available names from the List of North Indian Ocean storm names are below.

- Viyaru
- Phailin
- Helen
- Lehar
- Madi

== Season effects ==
This is a table of all storms in the 2013 North Indian Ocean cyclone season. It mentions all of the season's storms and their names, durations, peak intensities (according to the IMD storm scale), landfall(s) – denoted by bold location names – damages, and death totals. Damage and death totals include the damage and deaths caused when that storm was a precursor wave or extratropical low, and all of the damage figures are in 2013 USD.

Name	Dates	Peak intensity			Areas affected	Damage (USD)	Deaths	Ref(s).
Name	Dates	Category	Wind speed	Pressure	Areas affected	Damage (USD)	Deaths	Ref(s).
Viyaru	May 10–17	Cyclonic Storm	85 km/h (55 mph)	990 hPa (29.23 inHg)	Indonesia, Thailand, Sri Lanka, India, Bangladesh, Myanmar	>$35.3 million	107	
BOB 02	May 29–31	Depression	45 km/h (30 mph)	990 hPa (29.23 inHg)	Bangladesh, India	None	None	
BOB 03	July 30 – August 1	Depression	45 km/h (30 mph)	990 hPa (29.23 inHg)	Bangladesh, India	None	None	
LAND 01	August 20–23	Depression	45 km/h (30 mph)	990 hPa (29.23 inHg)	India	None	4	
Phailin	October 8–14	Extremely Severe Cyclonic Storm	215 km/h (135 mph)	940 hPa (27.76 inHg)	Malay Peninsula, Andaman and Nicobar Islands, India, Myanmar, Nepal	$4.26 billion	45	
ARB 01	November 8–11	Deep Depression	55 km/h (35 mph)	1,002 hPa (29.59 inHg)	Somalia, Ethiopia	Unknown	162	
BOB 05	November 13–17	Depression	45 km/h (30 mph)	1,003 hPa (29.62 inHg)	Malay Peninsula, Myanmar, Andaman Islands, Southern India, Sri Lanka, Yemen	None	16	
Helen	November 19–23	Severe Cyclonic Storm	100 km/h (60 mph)	990 hPa (29.23 inHg)	India	$796 million	11	
Lehar	November 23–28	Very Severe Cyclonic Storm	140 km/h (85 mph)	980 hPa (28.94 inHg)	Malay Peninsula, Andaman and Nicobar Islands, India	None	None	
Madi	December 6–13	Very Severe Cyclonic Storm	120 km/h (75 mph)	986 hPa (29.12 inHg)	Sri Lanka, India, Maldives	Unknown	None	
Season aggregates
10 systems	May 10 – December 13		215 km/h (135 mph)	940 hPa (27.76 inHg)		>$5.09 billion	323	

== See also ==
- Timeline of the 2013 North Indian Ocean cyclone season
- Tropical cyclones in 2013
- 2013 Atlantic hurricane season
- 2013 Pacific hurricane season
- 2013 Pacific typhoon season
- South-West Indian Ocean cyclone seasons: 2012–13, 2013–14
- Australian region cyclone seasons: 2012–13, 2013–14
- South Pacific cyclone seasons: 2012–13, 2013–14
