= Timeline of the 2013 North Indian Ocean cyclone season =

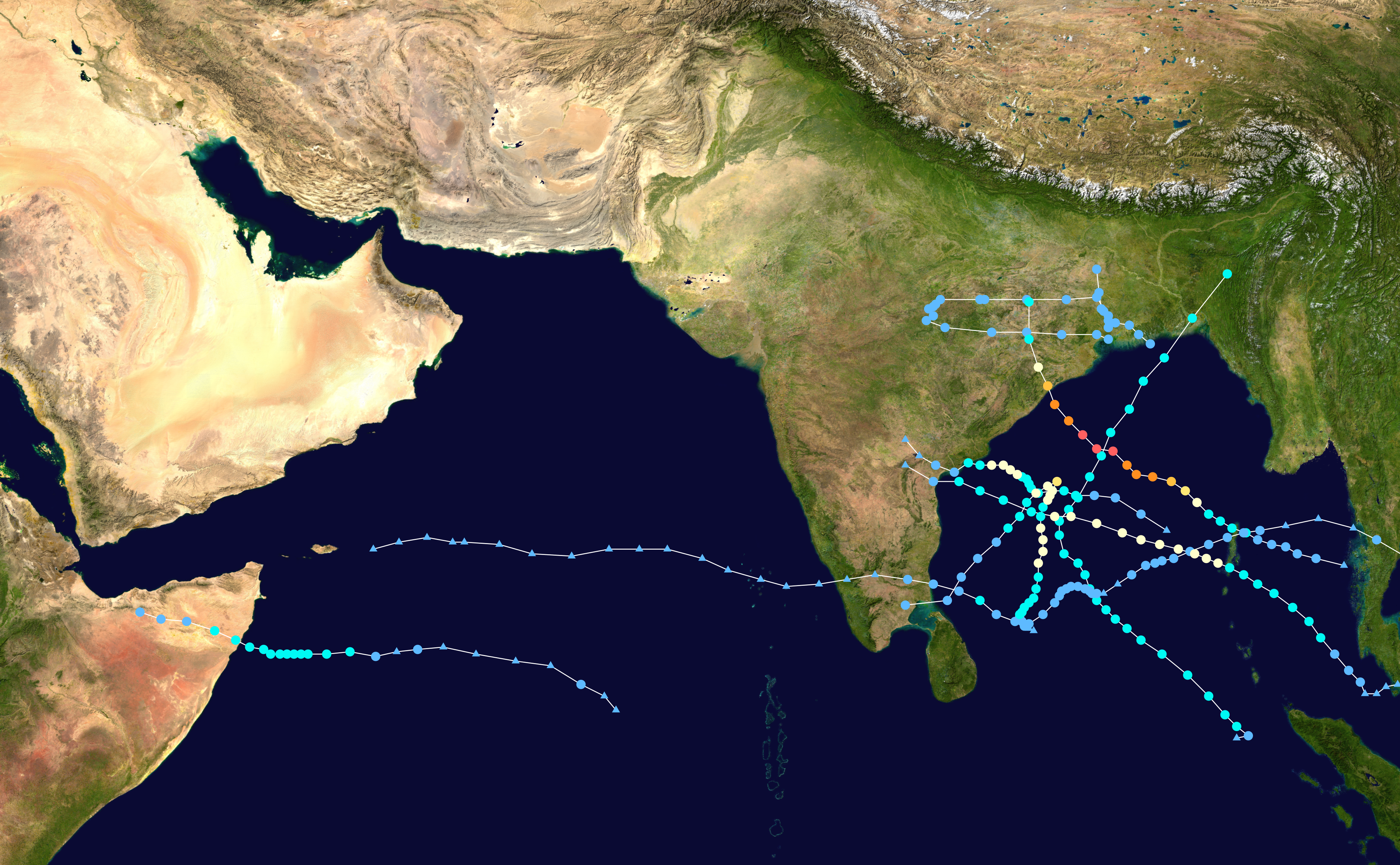
- Season summary map

Season boundaries
- First system formed: May 10, 2013
- Last system dissipated: December 13, 2013

Strongest system
- Name: Phailin
- Maximum winds: 215 km/h (130 mph) (1-minute sustained)
- Lowest pressure: 940 hPa (mbar)

Longest lasting system
- Name: Madi
- Duration: 6.125 days
Storm articles
- Cyclone Viyaru
- Cyclone Phailin
- ARB 01
- BOB 05
- Cyclone Helen
- Cyclone Lehar

The 2013 North Indian Ocean cyclone season was an average season during the period of tropical cyclone formation in the North Indian Ocean. (Note: The India Meteorological Department (IMD) defines an average North Indian Ocean cyclone season to include about 4-6 named storms.) The season began in May with the formation of Cyclone Viyaru, which made landfall on Bangladesh, destroying more than 26,500 houses. (Note: Cyclone Viyaru was operationally known as Mahasen.) After a period of inactivity, Cyclone Phailin formed in October, and became an extremely severe cyclonic storm. Additionally, it was a Category 5-equivalent cyclone on the Saffir–Simpson hurricane wind scale. It then made landfall in the Indian states of Andhra Pradesh and Odisha, becoming the most intense cyclone to strike the country since the 1999 Odisha cyclone. In November, cyclones Helen and Lehar formed, and they both made landfall in Andhra Pradesh just one week away from each other. The latter also affected the Andaman and Nicobar Islands.

This timeline documents all the events of this season, including the strengthening, weakening, formation, dissipation, and landfall of tropical cyclones in both the Bay of Bengal and the Arabian Sea. When depressions form in the Bay of Bengal, they receive the prefix BOB by the India Meteorological Department (IMD). Likewise, depressions which form in the Arabian Sea are designated the prefix ARB, and those which form over land are given the prefix LAND. The Joint Typhoon Warning Center (JTWC) also creates advisories on storms in the North Indian Ocean. It designates the prefix B for storms that form in the Bay of Bengal, and the prefix A for those which form in the Arabian Sea. Best track data from the IMD and JTWC is utilized in this article, which means that post-storm analyses take precedence over operational advisories and the like. Meteorologists use one time zone, Coordinated Universal Time (UTC), when issuing forecasts and advisories. As such, the time of the events in this season are listed in UTC as well as the local time, which is, in this case, Indian Standard Time (IST).

== Timeline of events ==
=== May ===
==== 10 May ====
- 00:00 UTC (5:30 a.m. IST) at 4.4°N 93.0°E – The JTWC reports that Tropical Depression 01B has formed.
- 06:00 UTC (11:30 a.m. IST) at 4.9°N 93.0°E – The JTWC reports that Tropical Depression 01B has intensified into a tropical storm.
- 09:00 UTC (2:30 p.m. IST) at 5.0°N 92.0°E – The IMD reports that Depression BOB 01 has formed.
- 12:00 UTC (5:30 p.m. IST) at 5.5°N 92.0°E – The IMD reports that Depression BOB 01 has intensified into a deep depression.

==== 11 May ====
- 03:00 UTC (8:30 a.m. IST) at 7.0°N 90.5°E – The IMD reports that Deep Depression BOB 01 has strengthened into Cyclonic Storm Viyaru.
- 06:00 UTC (11:30 a.m. IST) at 8.0°N 89.8°E – The JTWC reports that Tropical Storm 01A has reached its peak intensity with wind speeds of 85 km/h (55 mph) and a minimum pressure of 989 mbar (29.21 inHg).

==== 15 May ====
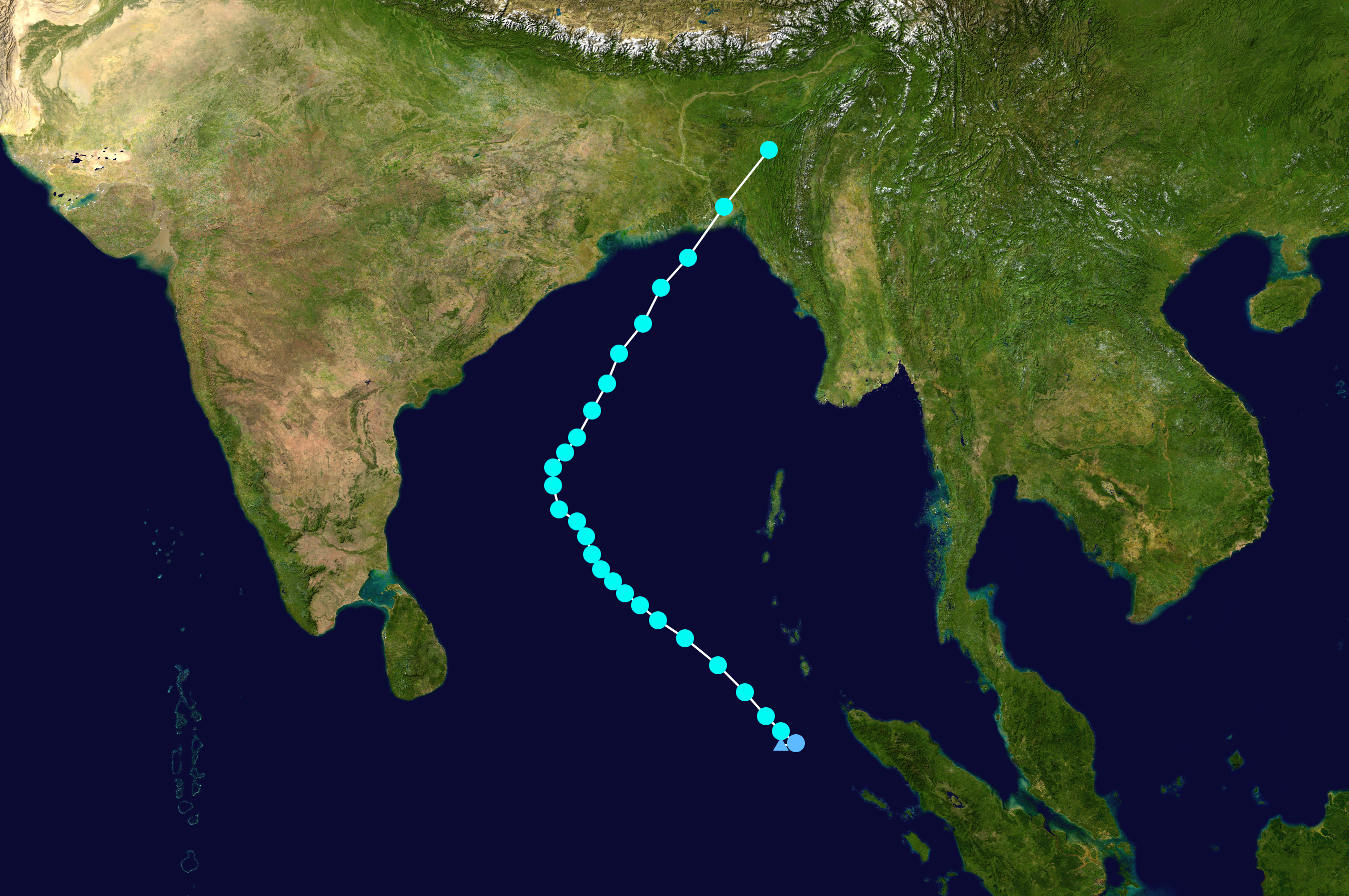
- Track of Cyclone Viyaru, according to the Saffir–Simpson wind scale
  06:00 UTC (11:30 a.m. IST) at 17.0°N 87.5°E – The IMD reports that Cyclonic Storm Viyaru has reached its peak intensity, with wind speeds of 85 km/h (55 mph) and a minimum pressure of 990 mbar (29.23 inHg).

==== 16 May ====
- 08:00 UTC (1:30 p.m. IST) at 22.8°N 91.4°E – The IMD reports that Cyclonic Storm Viyaru has made landfall on the Bangladesh coast about 30 km (20 mi) south of Feni.
- 12:00 UTC (5:30 p.m. IST) at 24.0°N 92.5°E – The IMD reports that Cyclonic Storm Viyaru has weakened to a deep depression.
- 18:00 UTC (11:30 p.m. IST) at 25.0°N 93.5°E – The IMD reports that Deep Depression Viyaru has degenerated into a depression.

==== 17 May ====
- 00:00 (5:30 a.m. IST) – The IMD reports that Depression Viyaru has weakened to a well-marked low pressure area over Nagaland.

==== 29 May ====
- 03:00 UTC (8:30 a.m. IST) at 21.0°N 89.5°E – The IMD reports that Depression BOB 02 has formed and simultaneously reached its peak wind speeds of 45 km/h (30 mph).
- 13:30–14:30 UTC (7:00–8:00 IST) at 21.8°N 88.7°E – The IMD reports that Depression BOB 02 has crossed the West Bengal coast.

==== 30 May ====
- 03:00 UTC (8:30 a.m. IST) at 22.3°N 87.5°E – The IMD reports that Depression BOB 02 has reached its minimum pressure of 990 mbar (29.23 inHg).

==== 31 May ====
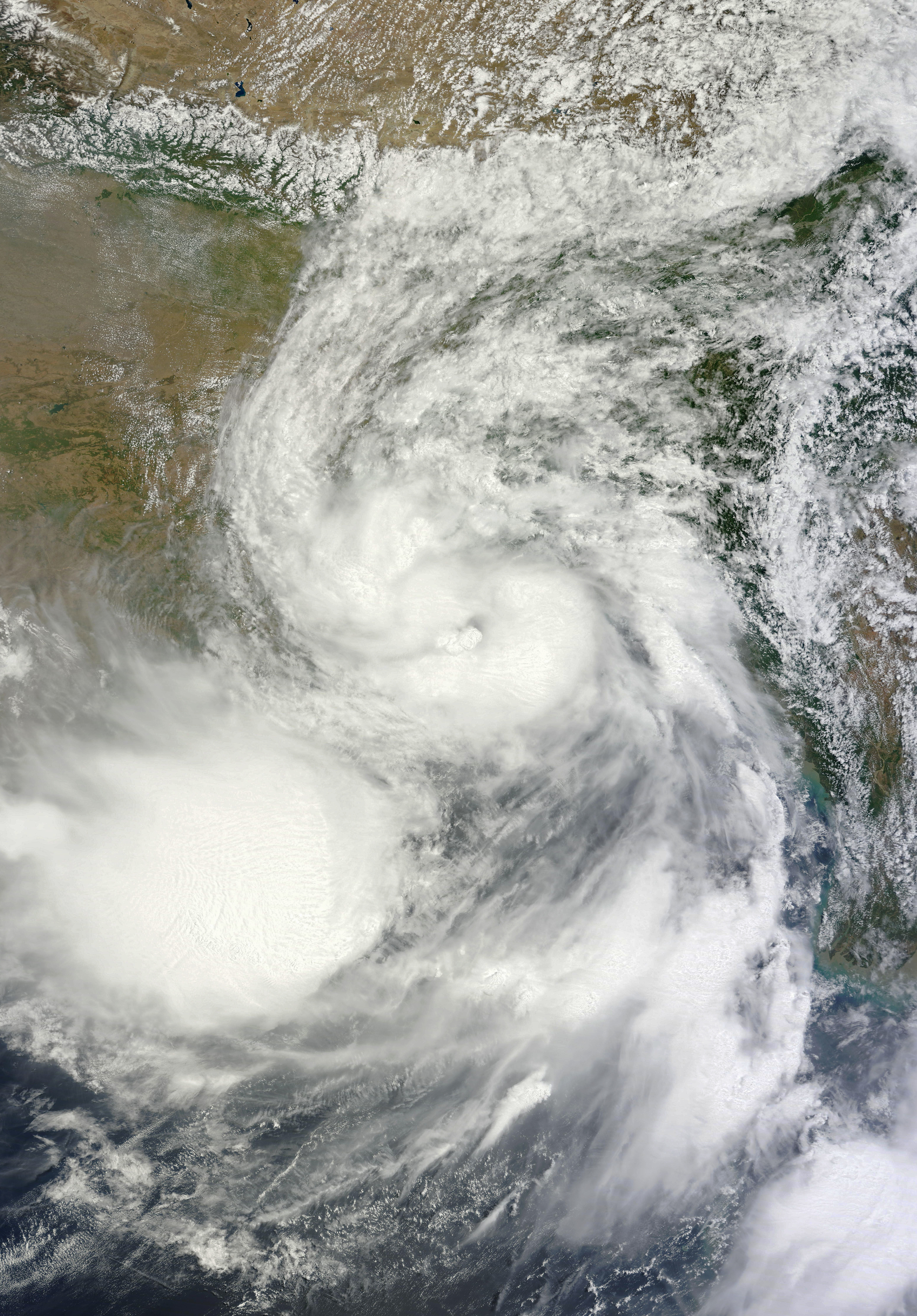
- Depression BOB 02 on May 29
  12:00 UTC (5:30 p.m. IST) – The IMD reports that Depression BOB 02 has degenerated into a well-marked low pressure area over Bihar and Jharkhand.

=== July ===
==== 30 July ====
- 03:00 UTC (8:30 a.m. IST) at 21.0°N 88.0°E – The IMD reports that Depression BOB 03 has formed and simultaneously reached its peak intensity with winds of 45 km/h (30 mph) and a minimum pressure of 990 mbar (29.23 inHg).
- 07:00 UTC (12:30 p.m. IST) – The IMD reports that Depression BOB 03 has crossed the North Odisha and the West Bengal coast between Balasore and Digha.

=== August ===
==== 1 August ====
- 03:00 UTC (8:30 a.m. IST) – The IMD reports that Depression BOB 03 has weakened into a well-marked low pressure area over southeast Madhya Pradesh and neighboring Chhattisgarh and Vidarbha.

==== 20 August ====
- 03:00 UTC (8:30 a.m. IST) at 22.0°N 87.5°E – The IMD reports that Depression LAND 01 has formed and also reached its peak intensity with winds of 45 km/h (30 mph) and a minimum pressure of 990 mbar (29.23 inHg).

==== 23 August ====
- 03:00 UTC (8:30 a.m. IST) – The IMD reports that Depression LAND 01 has become a well-marked low-pressure area over the central area of south Madhya Pradesh and Vidarbha.

=== October ===
==== 7 October ====
- 18:00 UTC (11:30 p.m. IST) at 12.1°N 96.4°E – The JTWC reports that a tropical depression has formed in the Bay of Bengal.

==== 8 October ====
- 03:00 UTC (8:30 a.m. IST) at 12.0°N 96.0°E – The IMD reports that Depression BOB 04 has formed.

==== 9 October ====
- 00:00 UTC (5:30 a.m. IST) at 13.0°N 93.5°E – The IMD reports that Depression BOB 04 has strengthened into a deep depression.
- 12:00 UTC (5:30 p.m. IST) at 13.5°N 92.5°E – The IMD reports that Deep Depression BOB 04 has strengthened into a cyclonic storm and is subsequently named Phailin.

==== 10 October ====
- 03:00 UTC (8:30 a.m. IST) at 14.5°N 91.0°E – The IMD reports that Cyclonic Storm Phailin has become a severe cyclonic storm.
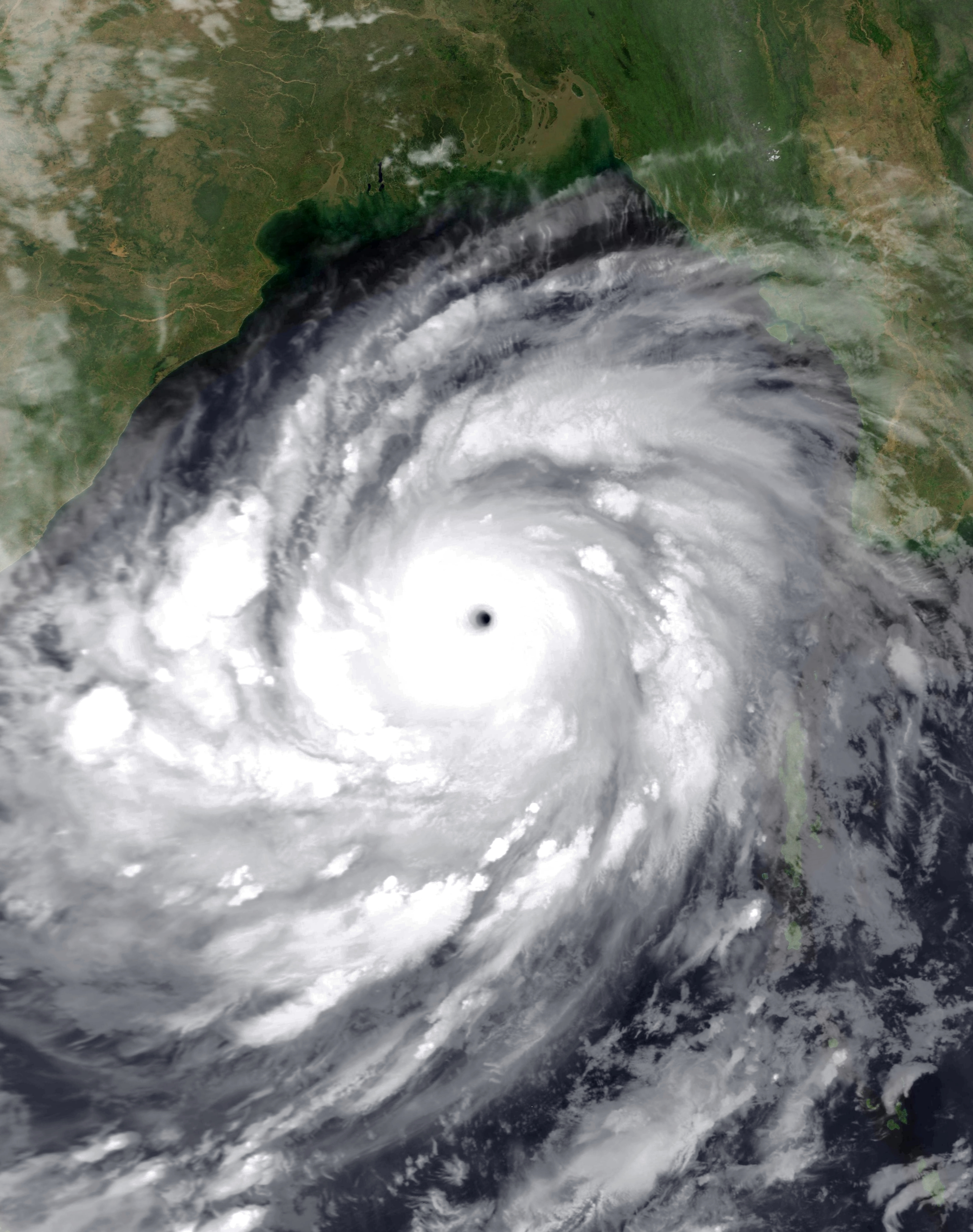
- Cyclone Phailin on October 10
  06:00 UTC (11:30 a.m. IST) at 15.0°N 90.5°E – The IMD reports that Severe Cyclonic Storm Phailin has rapidly intensified into a very severe cyclonic storm.
- 15:00 UTC (8:30 a.m. IST) at 15.5°N 90.0°E – The IMD reports that Very Severe Cyclonic Storm Phailin has quickly strengthened into an extremely severe cyclonic storm.

==== 11 October ====
- 03:00 UTC (8:30 a.m. IST) at 16.0°N 88.5°E – The IMD reports that Extremely Severe Cyclonic Storm Phailin has reached its peak intensity with winds of 215 km/h (135 mph) and a minimum pressure of 940 mbar (27.76 inHg).

==== 12 October ====
- 17:00 UTC (10:30 p.m. IST) at 19.2°N 84.9°E – The IMD reports that Extremely Severe Cyclonic Storm Phailin has made landfall over Odisha and the north Andhra Pradesh coast.

==== 13 October ====
- 00:00 UTC (5:30 a.m. IST) at 20.5°N 84.5°E – The IMD reports that Extremely Severe Cyclonic Storm Phailin has weakened to a very severe cyclonic storm.
- 03:00 UTC (8:30 a.m. IST) at 21.0°N 84.0°E – The IMD reports that Very Severe Cyclonic Storm Phailin has weakened to a severe cyclonic storm.
- 06:00 UTC (11:30 a.m. IST) at 21.5°N 84.0°E – The IMD reports that Severe Cyclonic Storm Phailin has weakened to a cyclonic storm.
- 18:00 UTC (11:30 p.m. IST) at 23.0°N 83.5°E – The IMD reports that Cyclonic Storm Phailin has degenerated into a deep depression.

==== 14 October ====
- 03:00 UTC (8:30 a.m. IST) at 24.0°N 84.1°E – The IMD reports that Deep Depression Phailin has degenerated into a depression.
- 09:00 UTC (2:30 p.m. IST) – The IMD reports that Depression Phailin has weakened to a well-marked low pressure area over southwest Bihar and the areas surrounding it.

=== November ===
==== 8 November ====
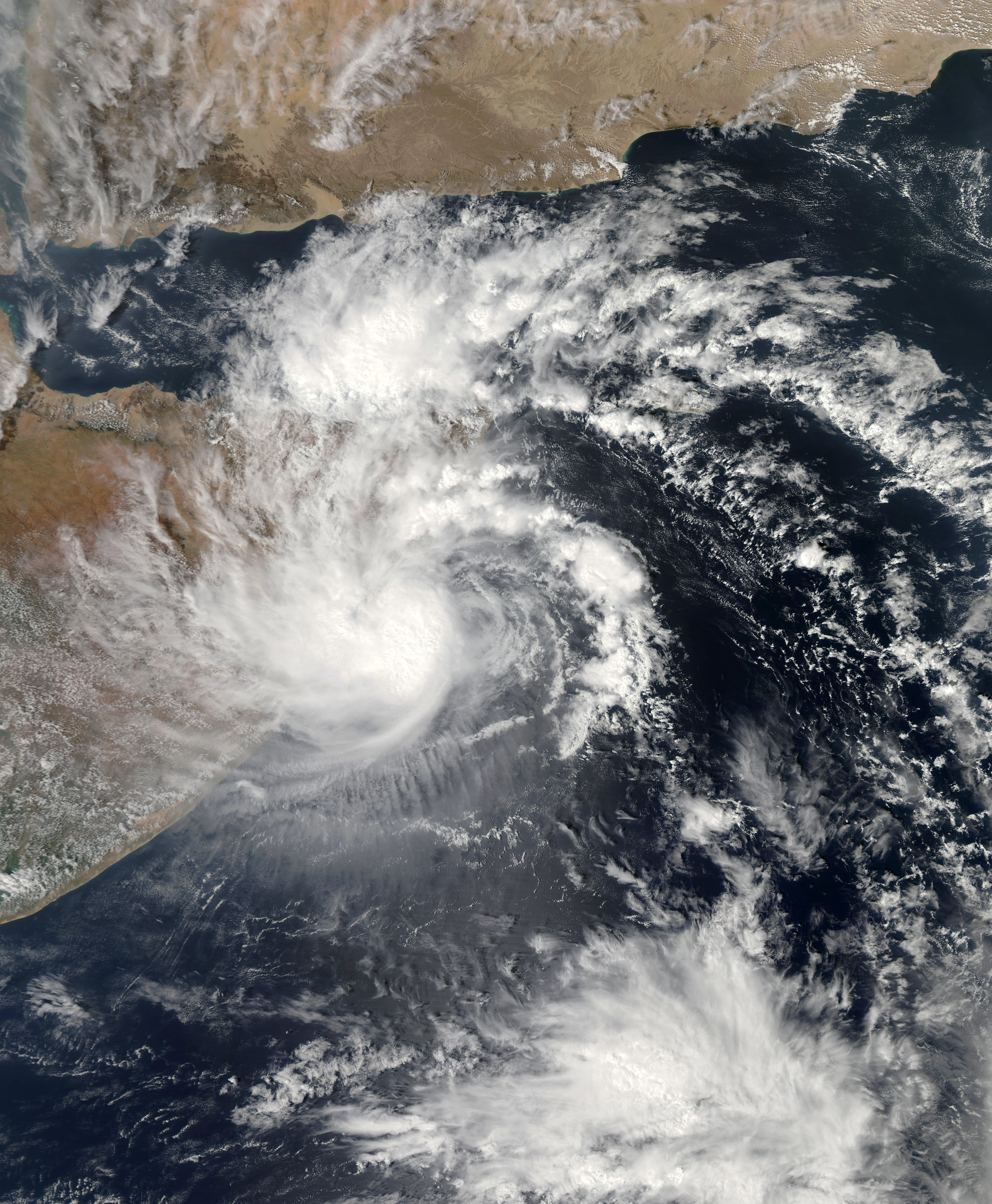
- Deep Depression ARB 01 near the coast of Somalia on November 10
  06:00 UTC (11:30 a.m. IST) at 8.0°N 86.5°E – The IMD reports that Depression ARB 01 has formed.

==== 9 November ====
- 00:00 UTC(5:30 a.m. IST) at 8.0°N 53.0°E – The IMD reports that Depression ARB 01 has intensified into a deep depression and simultaneously reaches its peak intensity with wind speeds of 55 km/h (35 mph) and a peak intensity of 1,002 mbar (29.59 inHg).

==== 10 November ====
- 23:00–00:00 UTC (4:30–5:30 a.m. IST 11 November) at 8.2°N 50.1°E – The IMD reports tha tDeep Depression ARB 01 has made landfall on the coast of Somalia.

==== 11 November ====
- 06:00 UTC (11:30 a.m. IST) at 8.7°N 49.3°E – The IMD reports that Deep Depression ARB 01 has weakened to a depression.
- 12:00 UTC (5:30 p.m. IST) – The IMD reports that Depression ARB 01 has weakened to a well-marked low pressure area over Somalia.

==== 13 November ====
- 00:00 UTC (5:30 a.m. IST) at 11.5°N 86.5°E – The IMD reports that Depression BOB 05 has formed.
- 12:00 UTC (5:30 p.m. IST) at 11.5°N 86.0°E – The IMD reports that Depression BOB 05 has reached its peak intensity with winds of 45 km/h (30 mph) and a minimum pressure of 1,003 mbar (29.62 inHg).

==== 16 November ====
- 07:30 UTC (1:00 p.m. IST) – The IMD reports that Depression BOB 05 has made landfall on the Tamil Nadu coast near Nagapattinam.

==== 17 November ====
- 00:00 UTC (5:30 a.m. IST) – The IMD reports that Depression BOB 05 has weakened to a well-marked low pressure area over northern Tamil Nadu and the areas surrounding it.

==== 19 November ====
- 00:00 UTC (5:30 a.m. IST) at 14.5°N 86.5°E – The IMD reports that Depression BOB 06 has formed.
- 15:00 UTC (8:30 p.m. IST) at 15.0°N 85.0°E – The IMD reports that Depression BOB 06 has intensified into a deep depression.

==== 20 November ====
- 03:00 UTC (8:30 a.m. IST) at 15.0°N 84.0°E – The IMD reports that Deep Depression BOB 06 has strengthened into a cyclonic storm, receiving the name Helen from the IMD.

==== 21 November ====
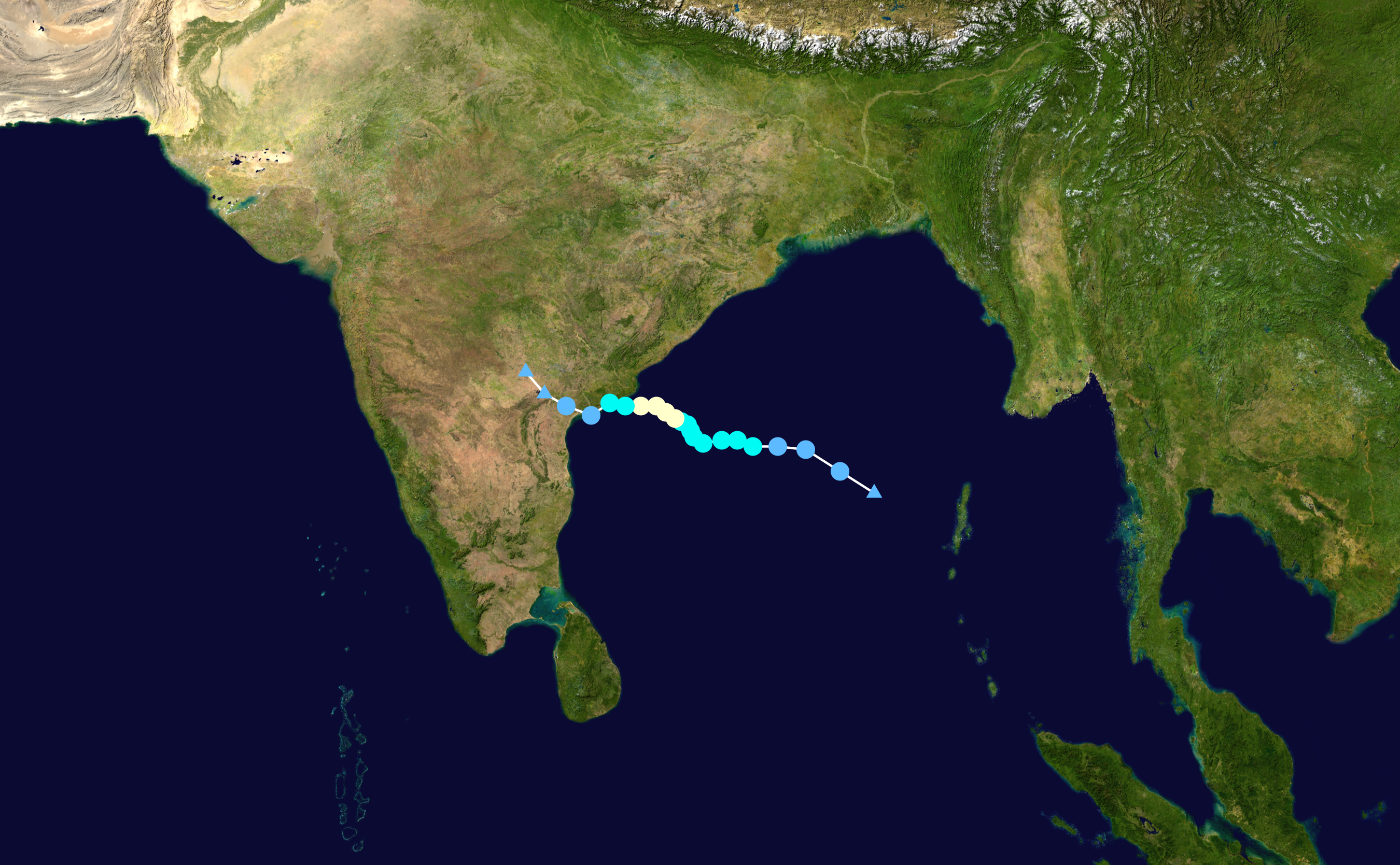
- Track of Cyclone Helen according to the Saffir–Simpson wind scale
  00:00 UTC (5:30 a.m. IST) at 15.6°N 83.5°E – The IMD reports that Cyclonic Storm Helen has intensified into a severe cyclonic storm.
- 06:00 UTC (11:30 a.m. IST) at 15.9°N 83.3°E – The IMD reports that Severe Cyclonic Storm Helen has reached its peak intensity with winds of 100 km/h (60 mph) and a minimum pressure of 990 mbar (29.23 inHg).

==== 22 November ====
- 08:00–09:00 UTC (1:30–2:30 p.m. IST) at 16.1°N 81.2°E – The IMD reports that Severe Cyclonic Storm Helen has made landfall on the Andhra Pradesh coast in south Machilliptnam.
- 09:00 UTC (2:30 p.m. IST) at 16.1°N 81.2°E – The IMD reports that Severe Cyclonic Storm Helen has weakened to a cyclonic storm.
- 12:00 UTC (5:30 p.m. IST) at 15.9°N 80.7°E – The IMD reports that Cyclonic Storm Helen has weakened to a deep depression.
- 18:00 UTC (11:30 p.m. IST) at 15.9°N 80.4°E – The IMD reports that Deep Depression Helen has weakened to a depression.

==== 23 November ====
- 00:00 UTC (5:30 a.m. IST) – The IMD reports that Depression Helen has degenerated to a well-marked low pressure area over coastal Andhra Pradesh and the areas surrounding it.
- 12:00 UTC (5:30 p.m. IST) at 8.5°N 96.5°E – The IMD reports that Depression BOB 07 has formed.
- 18:00 UTC (11:30 p.m. IST) at 9.0°N 96.0°E – The IMD reports that Depression BOB 07 has rapidly strengthened into a deep depression.

==== 24 November ====
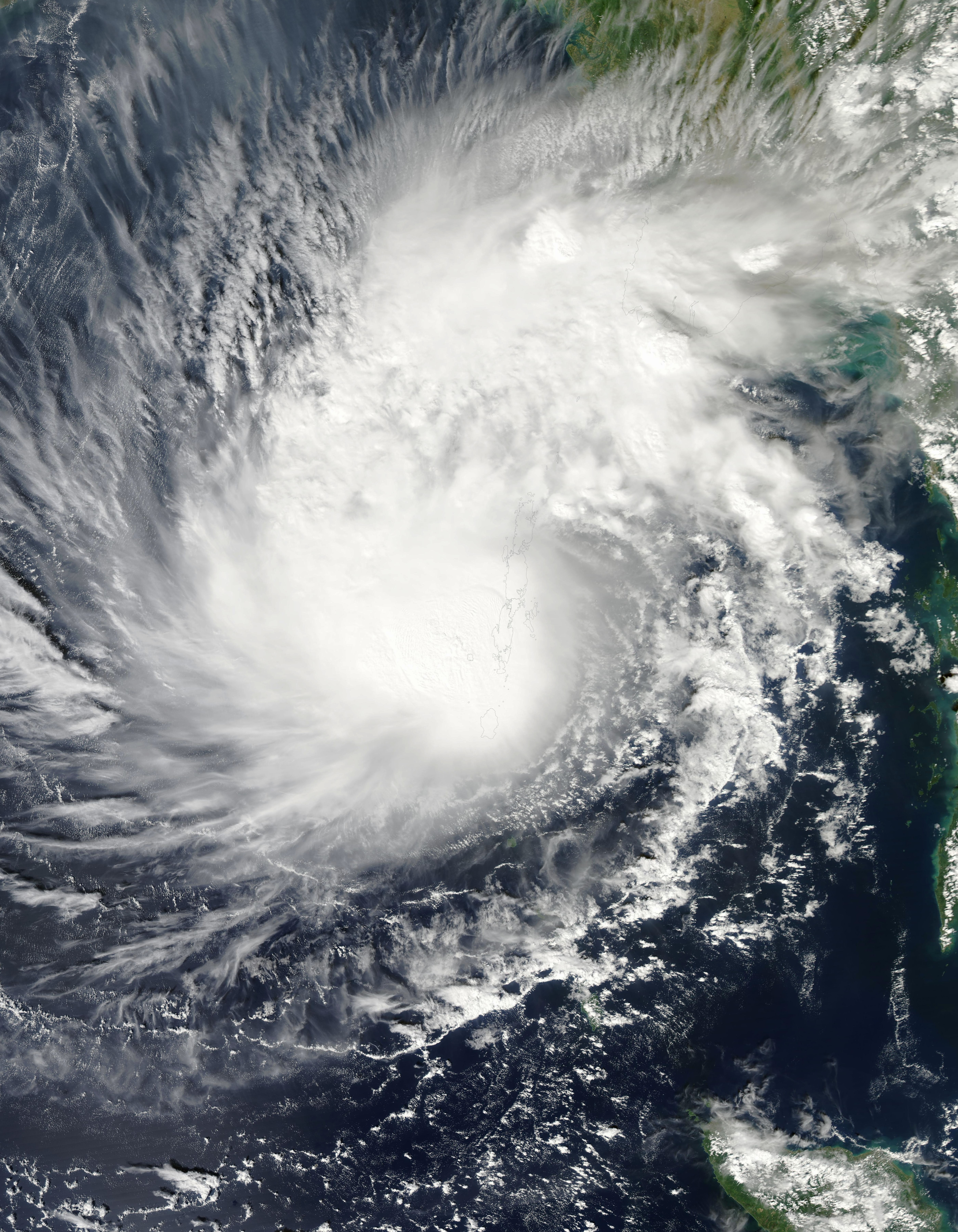
- Cyclone Lehar on November 25
  00:00 UTC (5:30 a.m. IST) at 10.0°N 95.0°E – The IMD reports that Deep Depression BOB 07 has rapidly intensified into a cyclonic storm. It is named Lehar by the IMD.

==== 25 November ====
- 00:00 UTC (5:30 a.m. IST) at 12.0°N 92.5°E – The IMD reports that Cyclonic Storm Lehar has made landfall on the Andaman and Nicobar Islands south of Port Blair, and simultaneously becomes a severe cyclonic storm.
- 21:00 UTC (2:30 a.m. IST 26 November) at 12.5°N 91.0°E – The IMD reports that Severe Cyclonic Storm Lehar has become a very severe cyclonic storm.

==== 26 November ====
- 18:00 UTC (11:30 p.m. IST) at 13.1°N 88.0°E – The IMD reports that Very Severe Cyclonic Storm Lehar has reached its peak intensity with winds of 140 km/h (85 mph) and a minimum pressure of 980 mbar (28.94 inHg).

==== 27 November ====
- 12:00 UTC (5:30 p.m. IST) at 14.5°N 85.0°E – The IMD reports that Very Severe Cyclonic Storm Lehar has weakened to a severe cyclonic storm.
- 18:00 UTC (11:30 p.m. IST) at 15.0°N 84.0°E – The IMD reports that Severe Cyclonic Storm Lehar has weakened to a cyclonic storm.

==== 28 November ====
- 00:00 UTC (5:30 a.m. IST) at 15.5°N 82.0°E – The IMD reports that Cyclonic Storm Lehar has weakened to a deep depression.
- 08:30 UTC (2:00 p.m. IST) at 15.9°N 81.1°E – The IMD reports that Deep Depression Lehar has made landfall on Andhra Pradesh close to Machilipatnam.
- 09:00 UTC (2:30 p.m. IST) at 15.9°N 81.0°E – The IMD reports that Deep Depression Lehar has weakened to a depression.
- 18:00 UTC (11:30 p.m. IST) – The IMD reports that Depression Lehar has weakened to a well-marked low-pressure area over coastal Andhra Pradesh and adjoining Telangana.

=== December ===
==== 6 December ====
- 03:00 UTC (8:30 a.m. IST) at 10.0°N 84.0°E – The IMD reports that Depression BOB 08 has formed.
- 18:00 UTC (11:30 p.m. IST) at 10.4°N 84.0°E – The IMD reports that Depression BOB 08 has intensified into a deep depression.

==== 7 December ====
- 00:00 UTC (5:30 a.m. IST) at 10.5°N 84.1°E – The IMD reports that Deep Depression BOB 08 has rapidly intensified into a cyclonic storm, receiving the name Madi from the IMD.
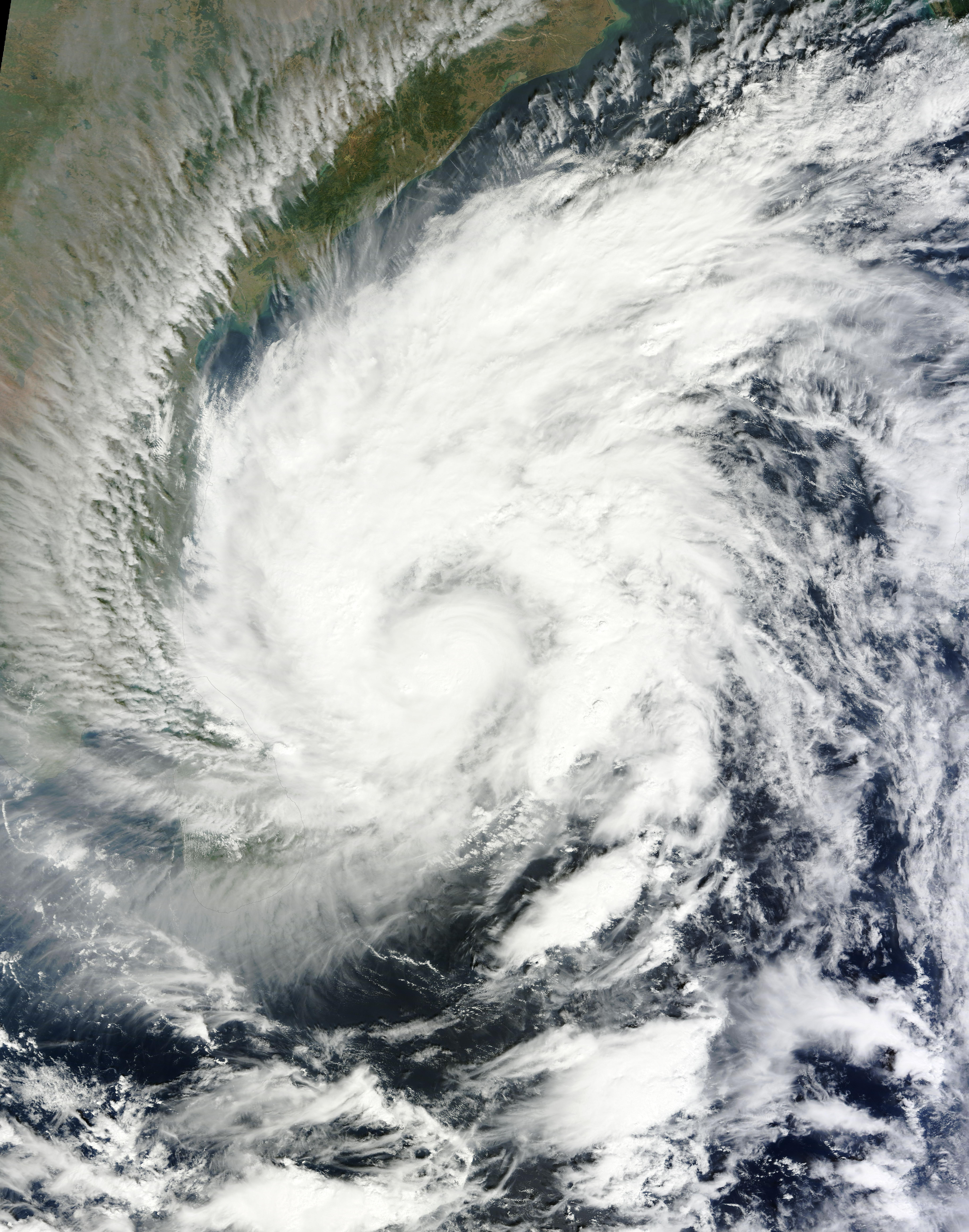
- Cyclone Madi on December 7
  09:00 UTC (2:30 p.m. IST) at 10.8°N 84.3°E – The IMD reports that Cyclonic Storm Madi has strengthened into a severe cyclonic storm.

==== 8 December ====
- 06:00 UTC (11:30 a.m. IST) at 12.3°N 84.7°E – The IMD reports that Severe Cyclonic Storm Madi has intensified into a very severe cyclonic storm and simultaneously reaches its peak intensity with winds of 120 km/h (75 mph) and a minimum pressure of 986 mbar (29.12 inHg).

==== 9 December ====
- 12:00 UTC (5:30 p.m. IST) at 14.6°N 84.7°E – The IMD reports that Very Severe Cyclonic Storm Madi has weakened to a severe cyclonic storm.

==== 10 December ====
- 03:00 UTC (8:30 a.m. IST) at 15.3°N 85.3°E – The IMD reports that Severe Cyclonic Storm Madi has re-intensified into a very severe cyclonic storm.
- 12:00 UTC (5:30 p.m. IST) at 15.4°N 85.0°E – The IMD reports that Very Severe Cyclonic Storm Madi has weakened back into a severe cyclonic storm.
- 21:00 UTC (2:30 a.m. IST 11 December) at 14.6°N 84.6°E – The IMD reports that Severe Cyclonic Storm Madi has weakened to a cyclonic storm.

==== 11 December ====
- 03:00 UTC (8:30 a.m. IST) at 14.0°N 83.8°E – The IMD reports that Cyclonic Storm Madi has degenerated to a deep depression.
- 18:00 UTC (11:30 p.m. IST) at 12.9°N 82.7°E – The IMD reports that Deep Depression Madi has weakened to a depression.

==== 12 December ====
- 13:30 UTC (7:00 p.m. IST) – The IMD reports that Depression Madi has made landfall on the Tamil Nadu coast near Vedaranyam. It later crossed back into the Palk Strait.
- 17:00 UTC (10:30 p.m. IST) – The IMD reports that Depression Madi has made landfall on the Tamil Nadu coast again near Tondi.

==== 13 December ====
- 00:00 UTC (5:30 a.m. IST) – The IMD reports that Depression Madi has weakened to a well-marked low pressure area over the southeast Arabian Sea near the Kerala coast.

== See also ==
- 2013 North Indian Ocean cyclone season
- Timeline of the 2013 Atlantic hurricane season
- Timeline of the 2013 Pacific hurricane season
- Timeline of the 2013 Pacific typhoon season
