= Typhoon Usagi (2013) =

Pacific typhoon in 2013

Typhoon Usagi (Odette)
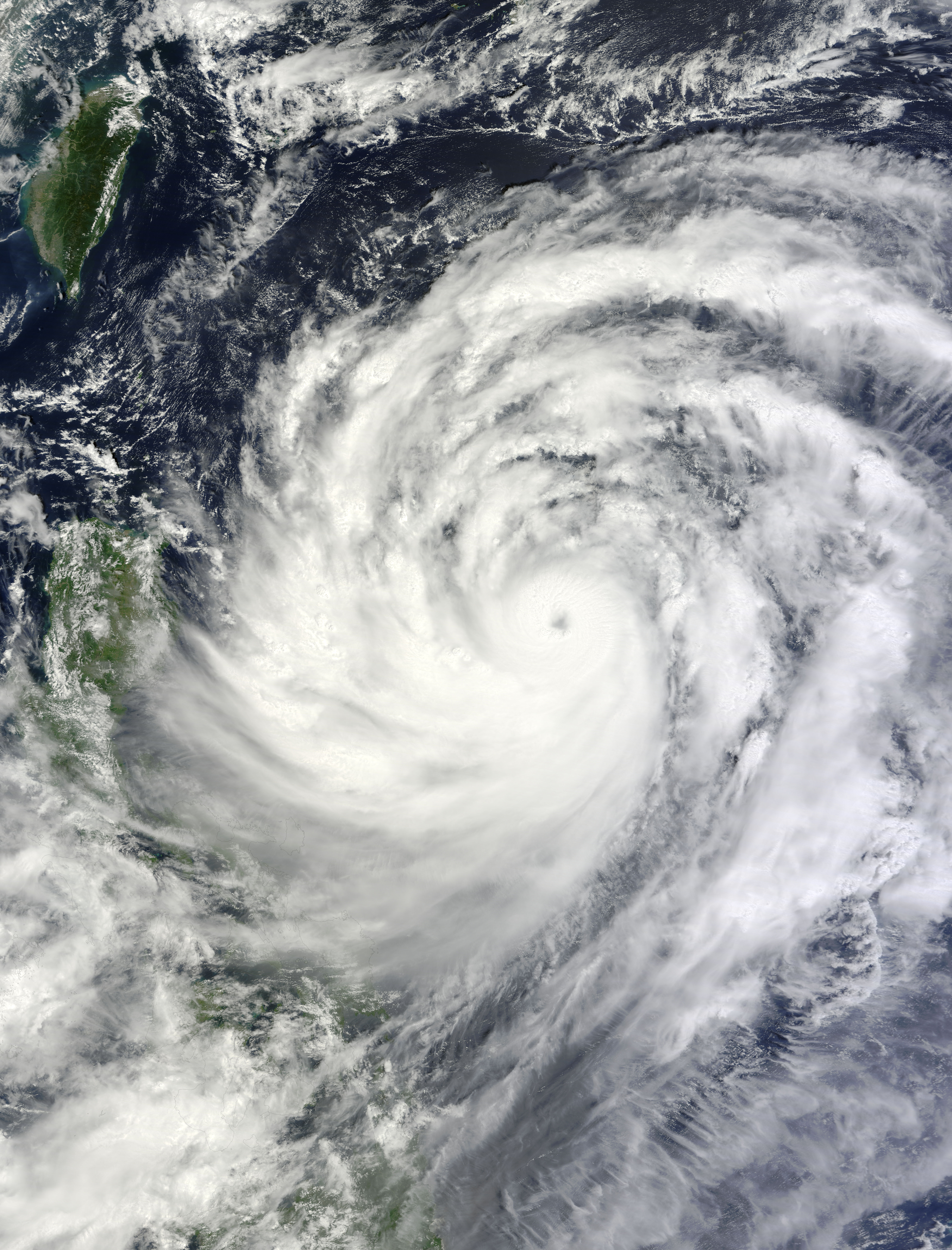
- Usagi near its peak intensity on September 19

Meteorological history
- Formed: September 16, 2013
- Dissipated: September 24, 2013

Violent typhoon
- 10-minute sustained (JMA)
- Highest winds: 205 km/h (125 mph)
- Lowest pressure: 910 hPa (mbar); 26.87 inHg

Category 4-equivalent super typhoon
- 1-minute sustained (SSHWS/JTWC)
- Highest winds: 250 km/h (155 mph)
- Lowest pressure: 922 hPa (mbar); 27.23 inHg

Overall effects
- Fatalities: 39
- Damage: $4.32 billion (2013 USD)
- Areas affected: Philippines, Taiwan, China, Hong Kong, Macau
- IBTrACS
- Part of the 2013 Pacific typhoon season

Typhoon Usagi, (Note: The name Usagi (Japanese: ウサギ, [ɯ̟sa̠ɡʲi]) was contributed by Japan and refers to the constellation Lepus, the hare, in Japanese.) known in the Philippines as Typhoon Odette, was a tropical cyclone which affected Taiwan, the Philippines, China, and Hong Kong in mid September 2013. Usagi was the fourth typhoon and the nineteenth tropical storm in the basin. Developing into a tropical storm east of the Philippines late on September 16, Usagi began explosive intensification on September 19 and ultimately became a violent and large typhoon. Afterwards, the system weakened slowly, crossed the Bashi Channel on September 21, and made landfall over Guangdong, China on September 22.

== Meteorological history ==
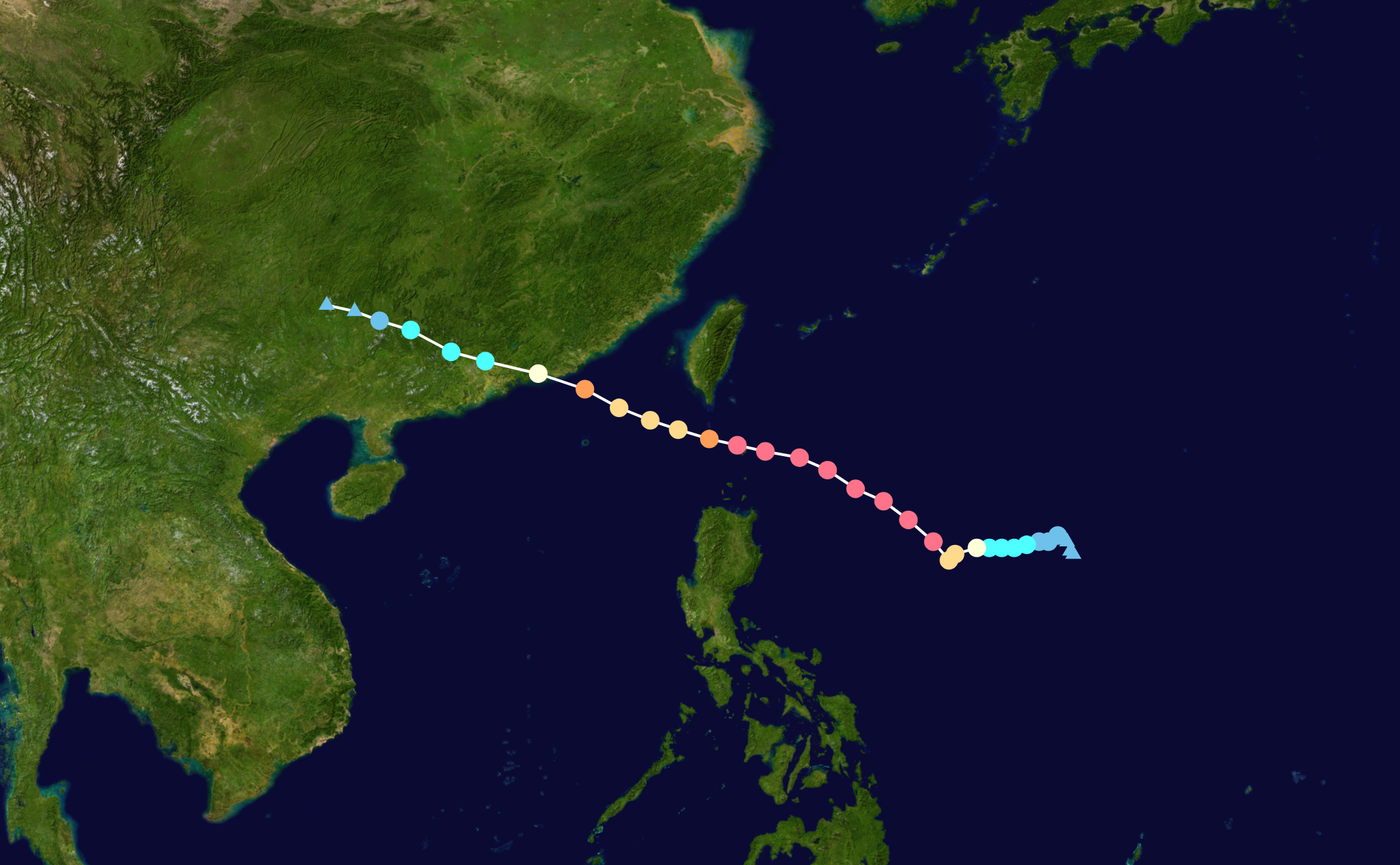
Map plotting the storm's track and intensity, according to the Saffir–Simpson scale Map key Saffir–Simpson scale Tropical depression (≤38 mph, ≤62 km/h) Tropical storm (39–73 mph, 63–118 km/h) Category 1 (74–95 mph, 119–153 km/h) Category 2 (96–110 mph, 154–177 km/h) Category 3 (111–129 mph, 178–208 km/h) Category 4 (130–156 mph, 209–251 km/h) Category 5 (≥157 mph, ≥252 km/h) Unknown Storm type Tropical cyclone Subtropical cyclone Extratropical cyclone, remnant low, tropical disturbance, or monsoon depression

Early on September 16, 2013, the Japan Meteorological Agency (JMA) started to monitor a tropical depression, that had developed within an area of low-moderate vertical windshear about 1,300 km (810 mi) to the east of Manila in the Philippines. During that day as the systems low level circulation centre became better defined, the Joint Typhoon Warning Center (JTWC) issued a Tropical Cyclone Formation Alert on the system while the Philippine Atmospheric, Geophysical and Astronomical Services Administration (PAGASA) named the system Odette.

Late on the same day, JMA upgraded the system to a tropical storm and named it Usagi; at the same time, The JTWC upgraded it to a tropical depression 17W, owing to a tropical upper tropospheric trough cell located to the east in association with an anticyclone enhancing the outflow in the eastern and southern quadrants.

On September 17, The JTWC upgraded Usagi to a tropical storm, as the system continued to consolidate and wrap tighter when slowly tracking westward along the extreme southern periphery of the subtropical ridge. Early on September 18, JMA upgraded Usagi to a severe tropical storm; at noon, both JMA and The JTWC upgraded Usagi to a typhoon, as deep convection had completely wrapped around a developing eye with radial outflow and low vertical wind shear. On September 19, Usagi began explosive intensification and formed a 28 km (17 mi) round eye; as the result, The JTWC upgraded Usagi to a category 5 equivalent-super typhoon on the Saffir–Simpson hurricane wind scale at noon. However, in a post season reanalysis, it was concluded that Usagi peaked with winds at 155 mph, making it a strong category four on the Saffir-Simpson hurricane wind scale. At 18Z, Usagi reached its peak intensity with 10-minute maximum sustained winds at 205 km/h (125 mph) and the atmospheric pressure at 910 hPa (26.87 inHg) On September 20, Usagi began an eyewall replacement cycle with a 75 km (47 mi) inner eyewall and a 190 km (120 mi) outer eyewall separated by a clearly defined moat, as well as the system began to weaken late on the same day due to land interaction between Taiwan and Luzon.

When Usagi had ventured into the Bashi Channel early on September 21, the JTWC downgraded it to a typhoon for convection becoming more shallow. However, sustained winds up to 180 km/h (110 mph) and the atmospheric pressure at 923 hPa (27.26 inHg) were recorded on Basco, Batanes when the eyewall passed the municipality. Later on, PAGASA recorded peak gust of 85 m/s (306 km/h) at Basco. Later, as the eyewall replacement cycle had completed, the eye became cloud-filled, although the environment remained favourable with excellent radial outflow and low vertical wind shear. On September 22, Usagi's eye resurged, allowing the typhoon to maintain its intensity while approaching the coast of China. At 11:40 UTC (19:40 CST), Typhoon Usagi made landfall over Shanwei, Guangdong, China with 10-minute maximum sustained winds at 85 knots (155 km/h, 100 mph) and the atmospheric pressure at 935 hPa (27.61 inHg). Soon, the JTWC issued its final warning on Usagi, while the JMA downgraded it to a severe tropical storm at 18Z. On September 23, the JMA downgraded the Usagi to a tropical storm and later a tropical depression in Guangxi. The system subsequently dissipated during September 24.

== Preparations and impact ==
=== Philippines ===
Early on September 17, PAGASA issued the public storm warning signal number 1 for Cagayan, Calayan and the Babuyan island groups, however these were lifted later that day as Usagi was expected to remain almost stationary for 24 – 36 hours. PAGASA subsequently reissued warning signal number 1 for Cagayan, Calayan, Isabela and the Babuyan island group, during the next day after the system became a typhoon and started moving again. Early the next day as the system intensified further Signal 1 and 2 were hoisted for 7 and 5 areas respectively. Later that day as Usagi approached Northern Luzon and the JTWC reported that the system had become a super typhoon signal 4 was raised for the Batanes island group while signal 3 was hoisted for the Calayan and Babuyan Island groups and various other areas were placed under signals 1 and 2.

A total of 4 people were killed by Usagi, and the damage nationwide reached ₱340 million (US$7.88 million).

=== Taiwan ===
In Taiwan, more than 3,000 people were evacuated from flood-prone areas and mountainous regions. Some mountain roads were blocked by landslides, and power outages suspended some train service.

=== China Mainland ===
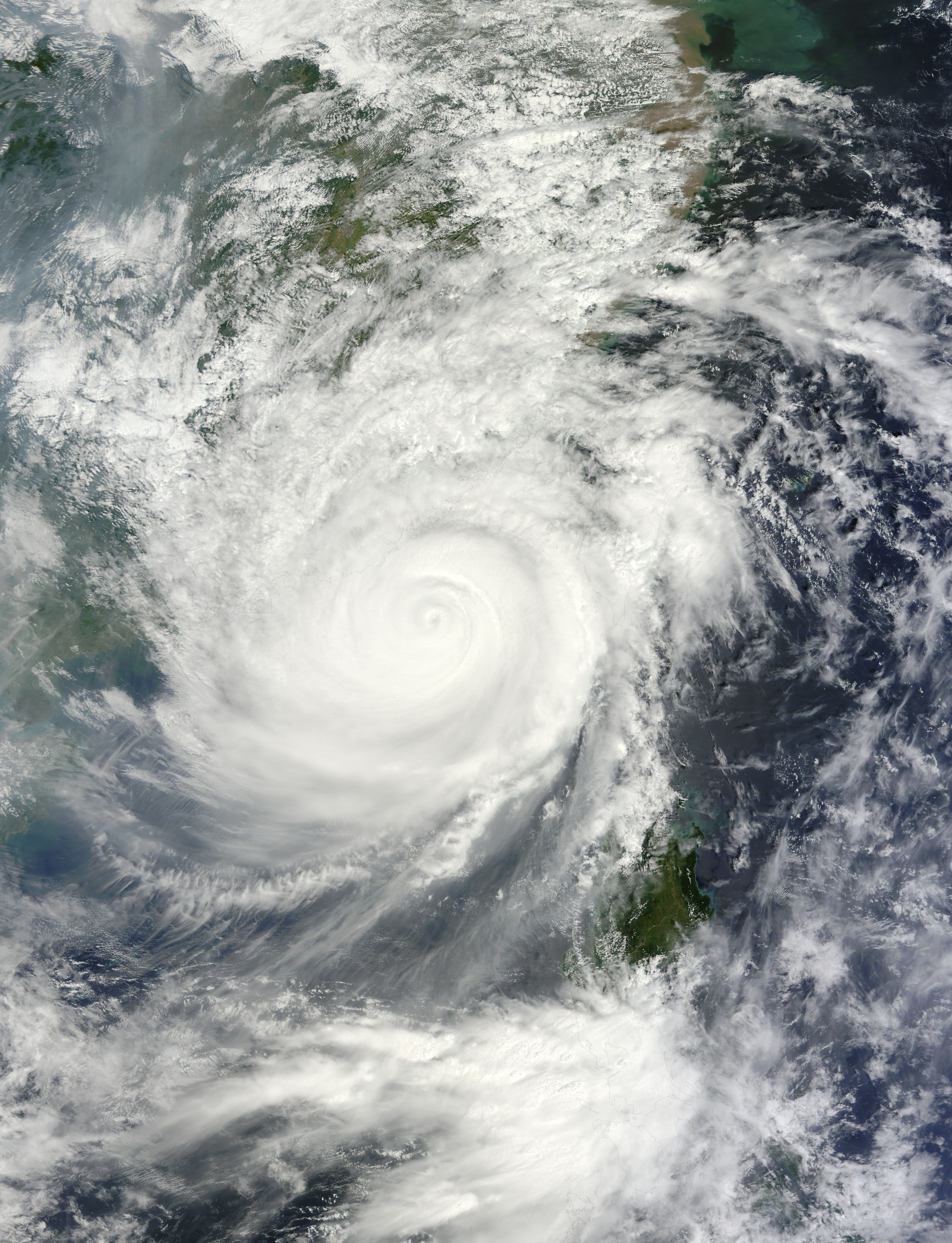
Typhoon Usagi approaching Guangdong, China on September 22

In China a total of 35 people were killed. Total economic loss reached ¥26.4 billion (US$4.31 billion). Guangdong was the hardest hit province during the storm, with 29 people died in the province and suffered a damage of ¥17.76 billion (US$2.9 billion). More than 9 million people were affected by Usagi in Guangdong.

Neighbouring Guangxi province also being affected by the rains of Usagi. The loss in the province reached ¥14.877 million (US$2.43 million). As far as Jiangxi province also felt the effects of Usagi. Heavy rains caused a river outflowed of its banks, and the damage in the province were at ¥16.94 million (US$2.77 million).

=== Hong Kong ===
In response to the storm's approach Hong Kong, the Hong Kong Observatory issued the No. 8 Gale or Storm Signal at 6:40PM local time on September 22. It made landfall near Shanwei of the Chinese Guangdong province, and passed to the north of Shenzhen, heading northeast. As the typhoon moved away from Hong Kong, the HKO lowered the typhoon signal to the Strong Wind Signal No. 3 at 9:20AM on September 23. Usagi dissipated on September 24.

As Usagi neared to Hong Kong, news and media began rapidly reporting on "the strongest storm in 34 years" that would hit Hong Kong. However, in the afternoon of September 22, Usagi's course veered northwest, and Hong Kong was subsequently spared from the impact of Usagi's eye wall, only being covered by Usagi's storm area. Usagi made landfall at 130 kilometers (80 miles) to the east-northeast, and continued further northward that expected. Even though Usagi caused a direct hit as it skirted at 80 km north of the Hong Kong Observatory Headquarters, the city faced only faced the strongest storm of the year, with northwest gales affecting many places including Victoria Harbour, Airport, Lau Fau Shan and Tai Mei Tuk, as well as occasional storm-force winds that were limited to Cheung Chau and some offshore areas. Hurricane was recorded only on high grounds like Ngong Ping and Tai Mo Shan. West to southwest gales took place later on as Usagi passed through Shenzhen. The most recent tropical cyclone that necessitated the issuance of Hurricane Signal No. 10 -- Typhoon Vicente from the previous year, was still more damaging in Hong Kong. Nevertheless, Usagi caused 17 injuries and prompted the Hong Kong Observatory to issue the No. 8 Gale or Storm Wind signal, keeping it in force for almost 15 hours.

Cathay Pacific Airways and Dragonair said flights on September 21 were unaffected, but for one canceled flight. However, both airlines announced that flights to and from Hong Kong International Airport would be cancelled starting 6 p.m. September 22 and resume the next day if conditions allow.

=== Macau ===
The damage in Macau was less than that in Hong Kong because Usagi veered northwest before impact, putting Macau at the edge of Usagi's gale area, thus having weaker winds. The Macao Meteorological and Geophysical Bureau originally stated to consider hoisting the Signal No.8 before 7:00PM local time (UTC+8) on September 22, but the sudden change of Usagi's track ruled out the possibility of hoisting higher signals. Usagi only required the Bureau to hoist the Signal No. 3, as the wind speed recorded in Macau reached the level of strong wind only. Usagi's closest point of approach to Macau is 100 km to the north-northeast, at 4:00AM on September 23, which means that it was barely a direct hit.

== See also ==
- Tropical cyclones in 2013
- Weather of 2013
- Typhoon Koryn (1993)
- Typhoon Kent (1995)
- Typhoon Sally (1996)
- Typhoon Hagupit (2008)
- Typhoon Krosa (2013)
- Typhoon Meranti (2016)
- Tropical Storm Ma-on (2022)
- Typhoon Doksuri (2023)
