= Tropical cyclones in 2013 =

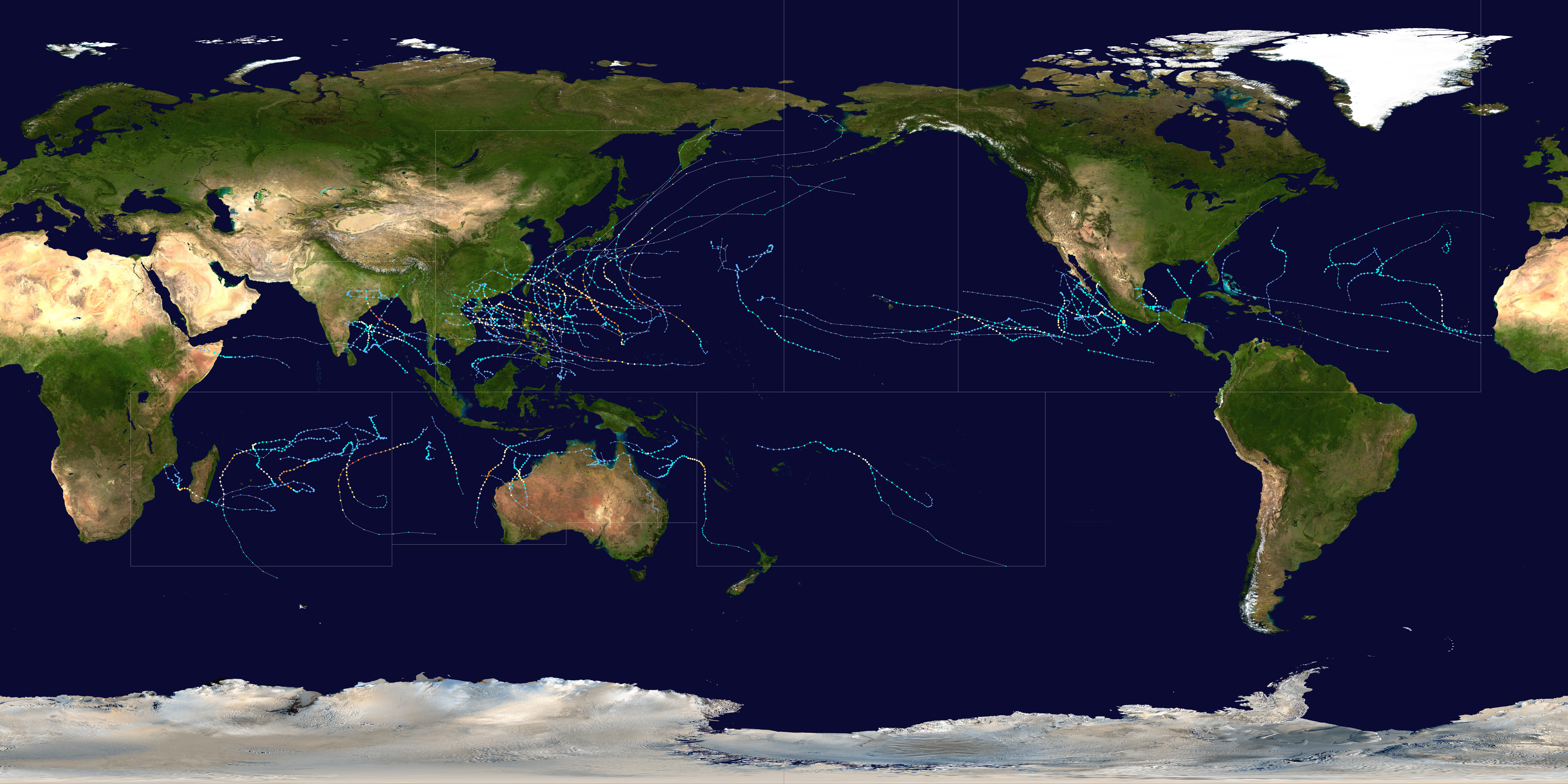
- Year summary map

Year boundaries
- First system: Sonamu
- Formed: January 1, 2013
- Last system: Bejisa
- Dissipated: January 4, 2014

Strongest system
- Name: Haiyan
- Lowest pressure: 895 mbar (hPa); 26.43 inHg

Longest lasting system
- Name: Wilma
- Duration: 19 days

Year statistics
- Total systems: 141
- Named systems: 89
- Total fatalities: 7,473 total
- Total damage: $41 billion (2013 USD)
Related articles
- 2013 Atlantic hurricane season
- 2013 Pacific hurricane season
- 2013 Pacific typhoon season
- 2013 North Indian Ocean cyclone season
- 2012–13 South-West Indian Ocean cyclone season
- 2013–14 South-West Indian Ocean cyclone season
- 2012–13 Australian region cyclone season
- 2013–14 Australian region cyclone season
- 2012–13 South Pacific cyclone season
- 2013–14 South Pacific cyclone season

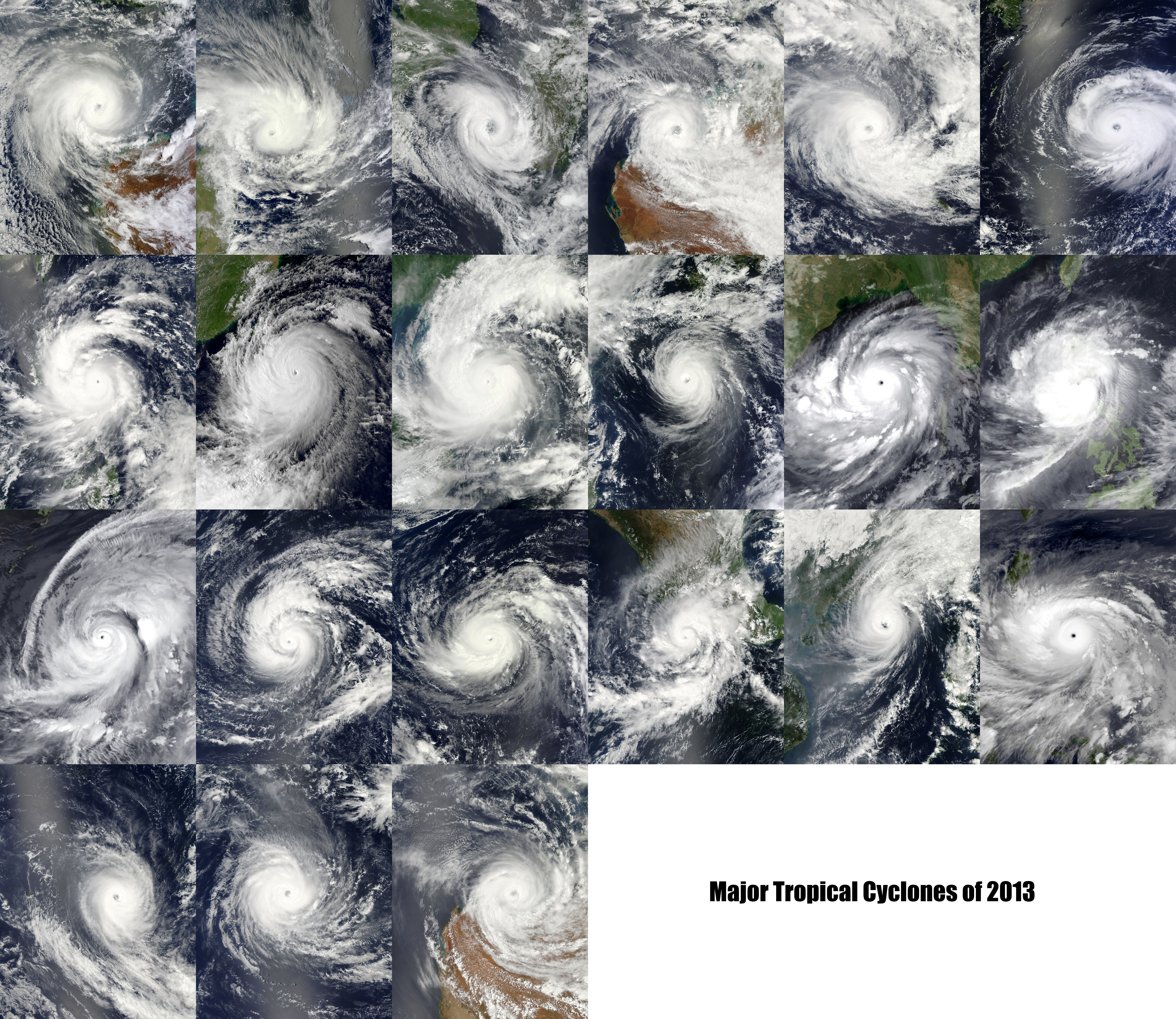
Satellite photos of 21 tropical cyclones worldwide that reached at least Category 3 on the Saffir–Simpson scale during 2013, from Narelle in January to Bejisa in December. Among them, Haiyan (far right; on the third row) was the most intense with minimum central pressure of 895 hPa

During 2013, tropical cyclones formed in seven major bodies of water, commonly known as tropical cyclone basins. They were named by various weather agencies when they attained maximum sustained winds of 35 knots (65 km/h; 40 mph). Throughout the year, a total of 141 systems formed, with 89 of them being named. The most intense and deadliest storm of the year was Typhoon Haiyan, which had a minimum pressure of 895 hPa (26.43 inHg) and at least 6,300 deaths in the Philippines, while the costliest tropical cyclone of the year was Typhoon Fitow, which caused damages amounting to $10.4 billion in China, becoming its costliest typhoon (in nominal terms) at the time. Among this year's systems, twenty-one became major tropical cyclones, including fourteen tropical cyclones of Categories 4 and 5, while five intensified into Category 5 tropical cyclones on the Saffir–Simpson scale (SSHWS). The accumulated cyclone energy (ACE) index for 2013 (seven basins combined), as calculated by Colorado State University (CSU) was 618.5 units overall, which was below the 1981-2010 mean of 789.0 units globally.

The most active basin in the year was the Western Pacific Ocean, which had 30 named systems, including one system that crossed from the Central Pacific. The Eastern Pacific Ocean had an above-average and destructive season, with 20 named storms forming; many of its systems were weak and short-lived; nine of those became hurricanes, and only one strengthened into a major hurricane. The North Atlantic had a total of 14 named storms; two of those became hurricanes. It was the first year since 1994 with no major hurricanes, Category 3 or higher on the Saffir–Simpson scale, and the first in the satellite era where no hurricanes reached Category 2 strength. The North Indian Ocean was active, with five named storms forming, producing the fourth-most accumulated cyclone energy in this basin on record. Activity across the Southern Hemisphere's three basins (South-West Indian, Australian, and South Pacific) was fairly significant, with the regions recording twenty-one named storms altogether, with the most intense Southern Hemisphere cyclone of the year, Cyclone Bruce in the South-West Indian, peaking with a central pressure of 920 hPa (27.17 inHg).

Tropical cyclones were primarily monitored by ten warning centers across the world, which are designated as a Regional Specialized Meteorological Center (RSMC) or a Tropical Cyclone Warning Center (TCWC) by the World Meteorological Organization (WMO). These ten centers are the National Hurricane Center (NHC) and the Central Pacific Hurricane Center (CPHC), Japan Meteorological Agency (JMA), Indian Meteorological Department (IMD), Météo-France (MFR), Indonesia's Meteorology, Climatology, and Geophysical Agency (BMKG), the Australian Bureau of Meteorology (BoM), Papua New Guinea's National Weather Service (PNGNWS), the Fiji Meteorological Service (FMS), and New Zealand's MetService. Unofficial, but still notable, warning centres include the Philippine Atmospheric, Geophysical and Astronomical Services Administration (PAGASA), the United States's Joint Typhoon Warning Center (JTWC), and the Brazilian Navy Hydrographic Center.

== Global atmospheric and hydrological conditions ==
The El Niño–Southern Oscillation stayed in its neutral phase throughout the year, with no major fluctuations towards either an El Niño or La Niña event. However, during May and June, sea temperatures in the far eastern tropical Pacific Ocean were well below average. By October, though, they returned to normal.

== Summary ==
=== North Atlantic ===
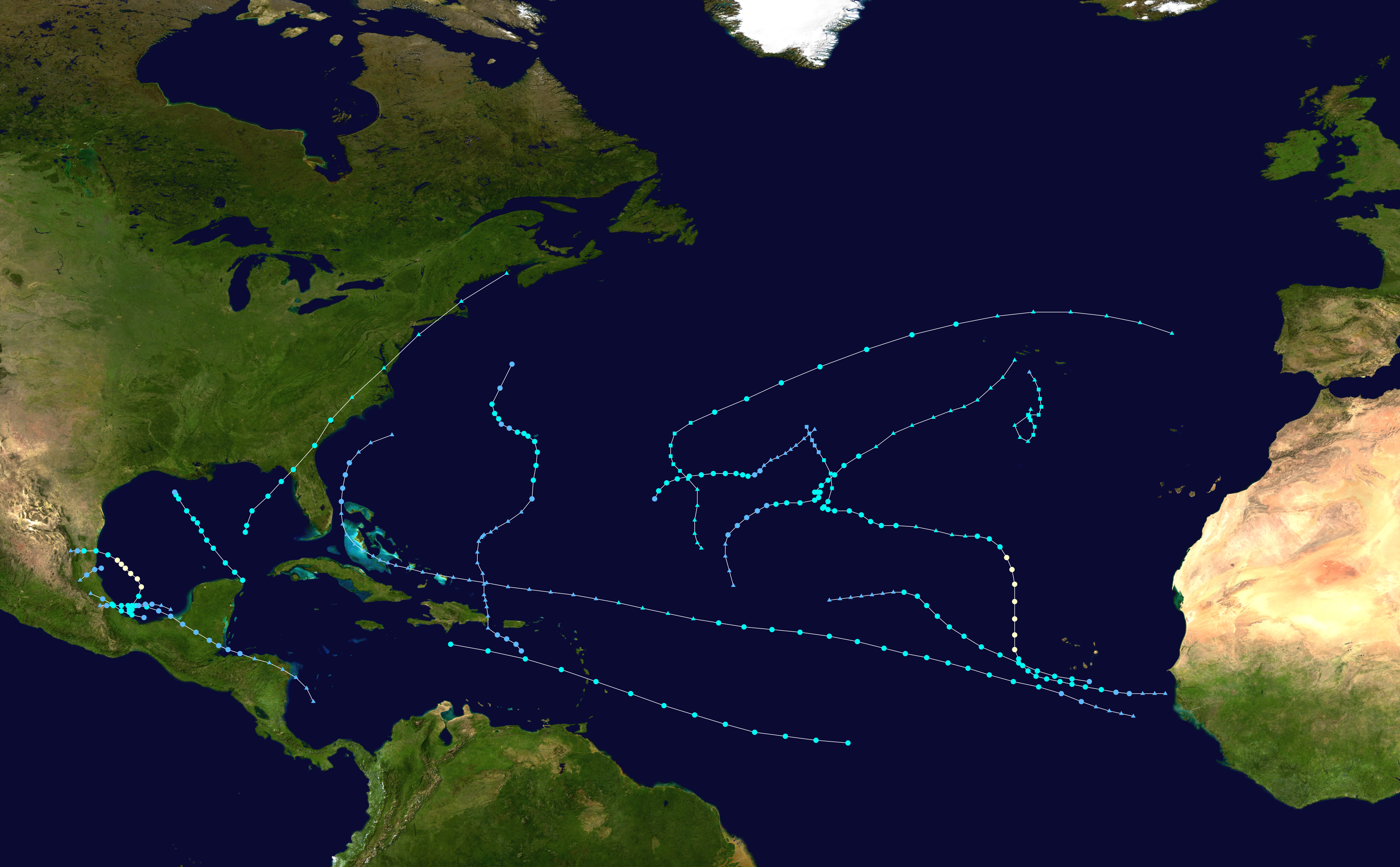
2013 Atlantic hurricane season summary map

The 2013 Atlantic hurricane season was a very inactive season, featuring only two hurricanes and no major hurricanes.

=== Eastern Pacific ===
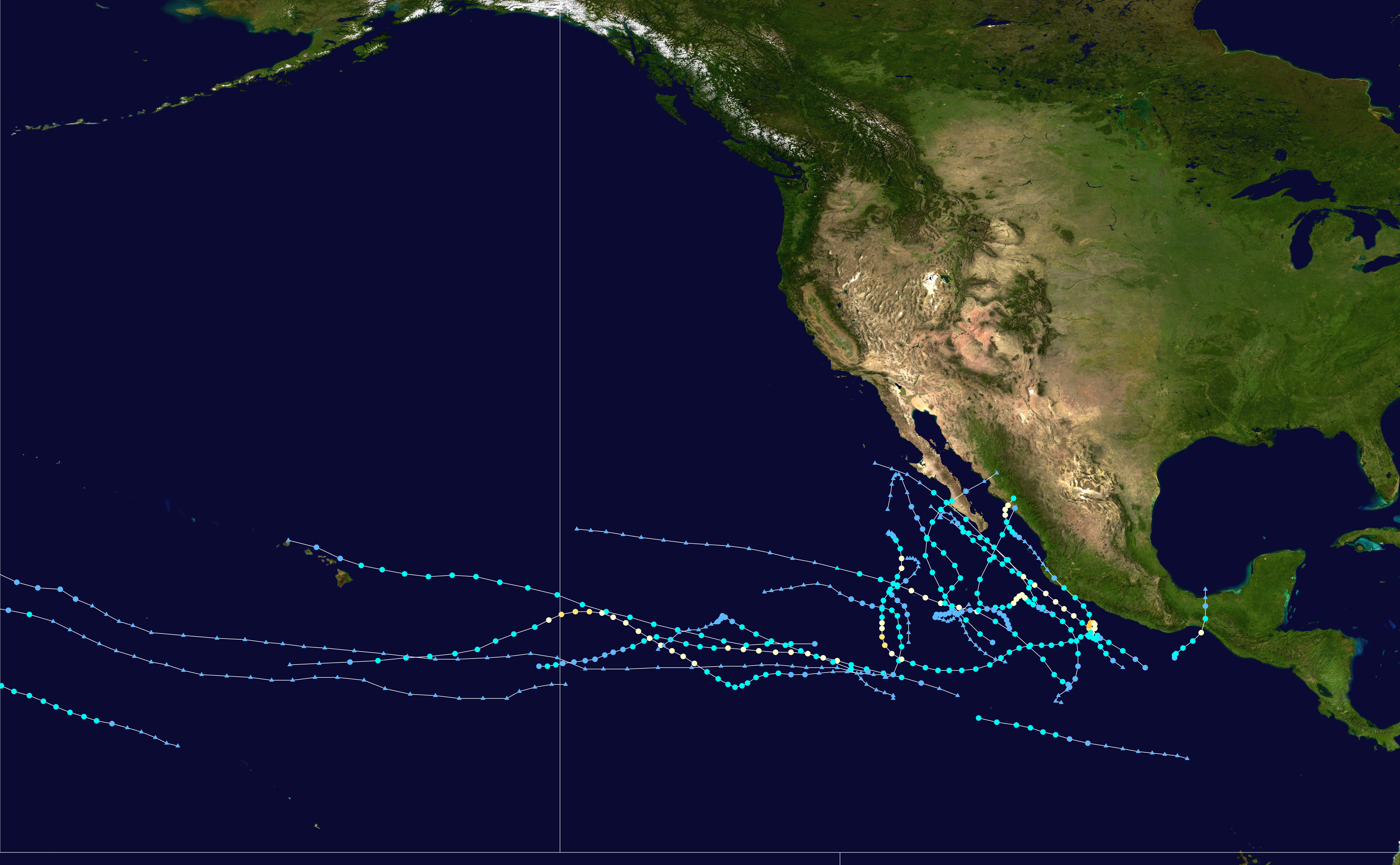
2013 Pacific hurricane season summary map

The 2013 Pacific hurricane season featured nine hurricanes, including Hurricane Manuel, the second costliest Pacific hurricane on record.

=== Western Pacific ===
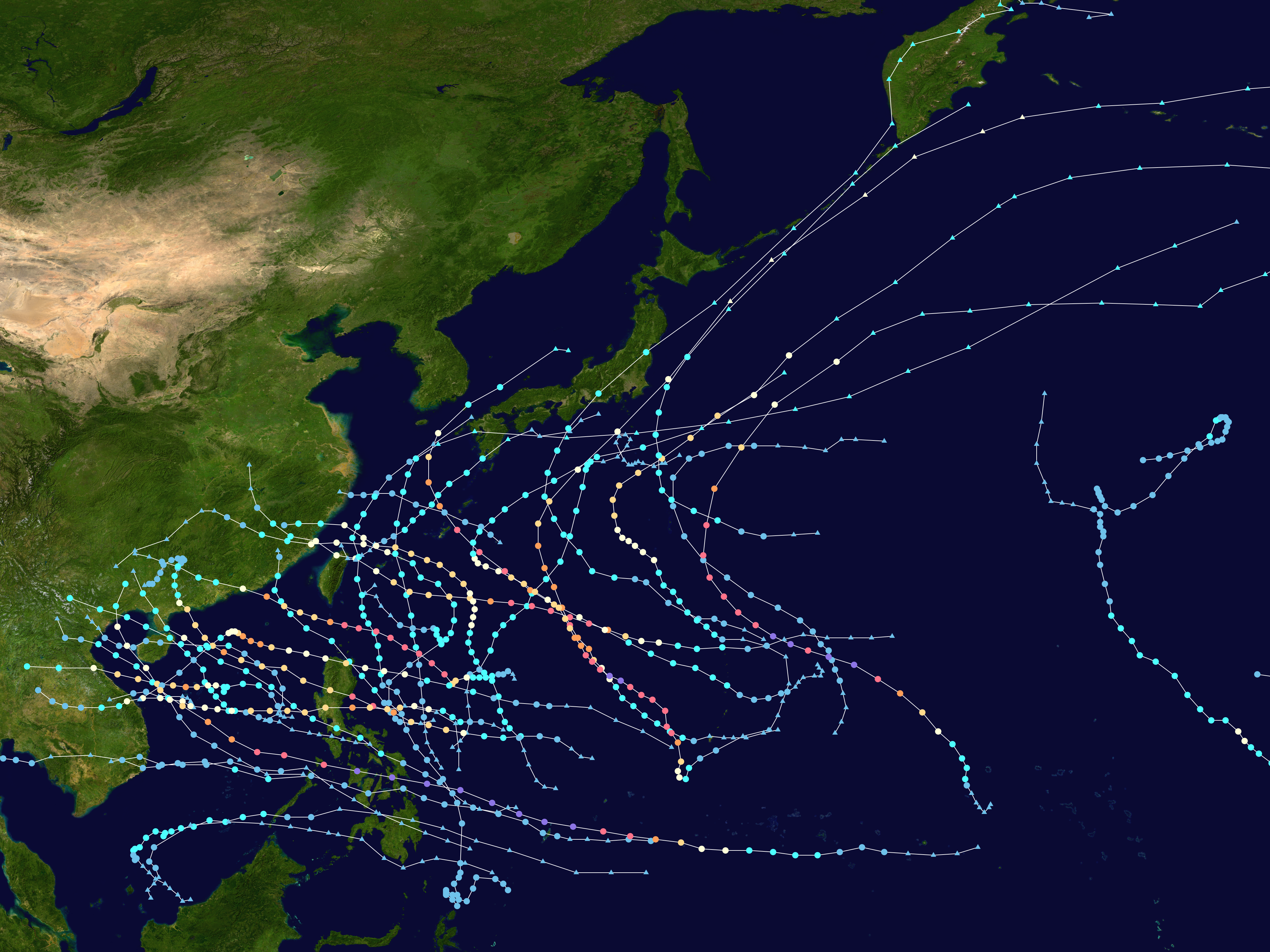
2013 Pacific typhoon season summary map

The 2013 Pacific typhoon season was the most active season since the 2004 season, deadliest since 1975, and featured Typhoon Haiyan, one of the strongest tropical cyclones to ever exist.

=== North Indian ===
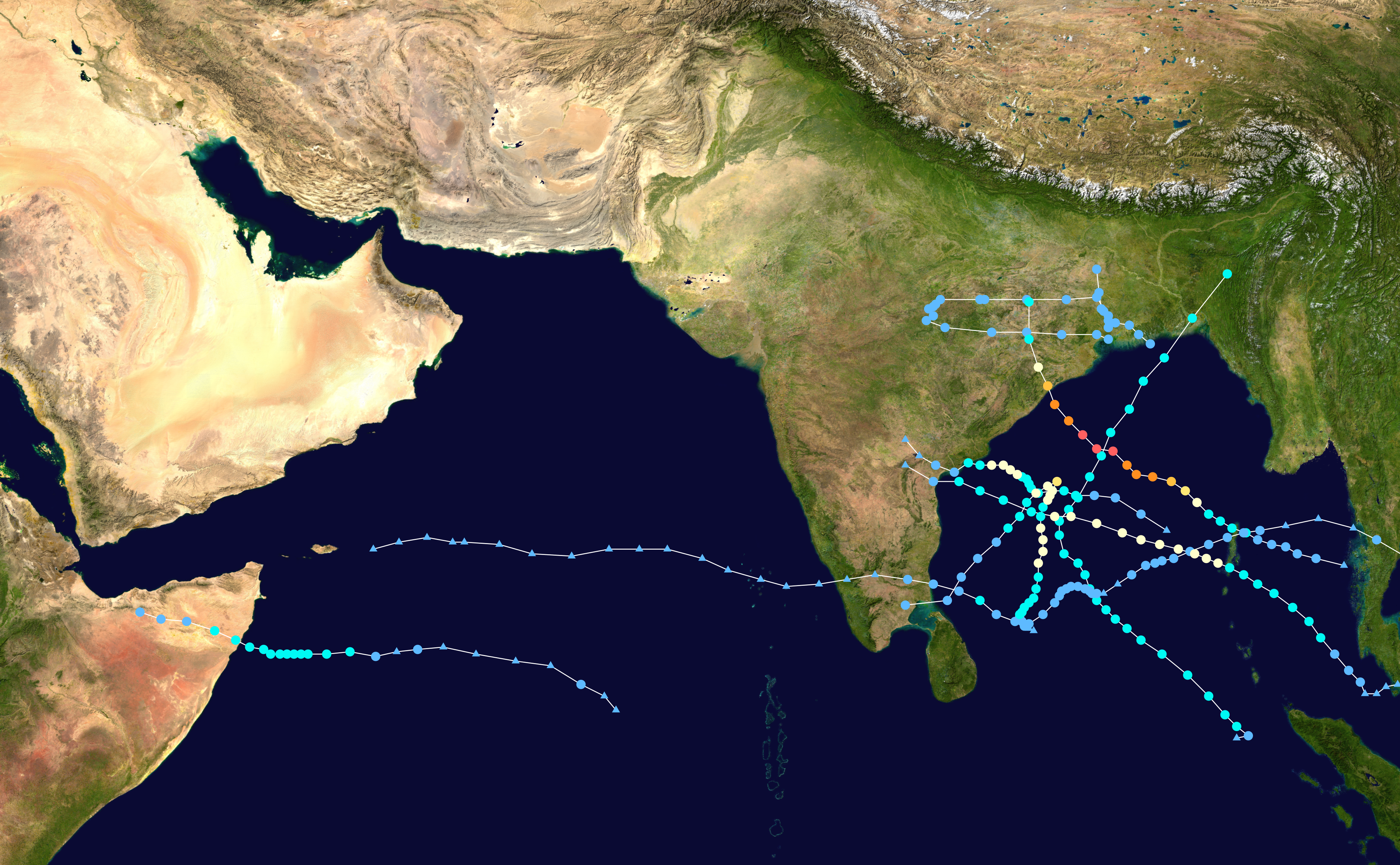
2013 North Indian Ocean cyclone season summary map

The 2013 North Indian Ocean Season was the most active since 2010 and 2007. It also featured one of the most intense tropical systems to make landfall in India - Cyclone Phalin.

== Systems ==
=== January ===
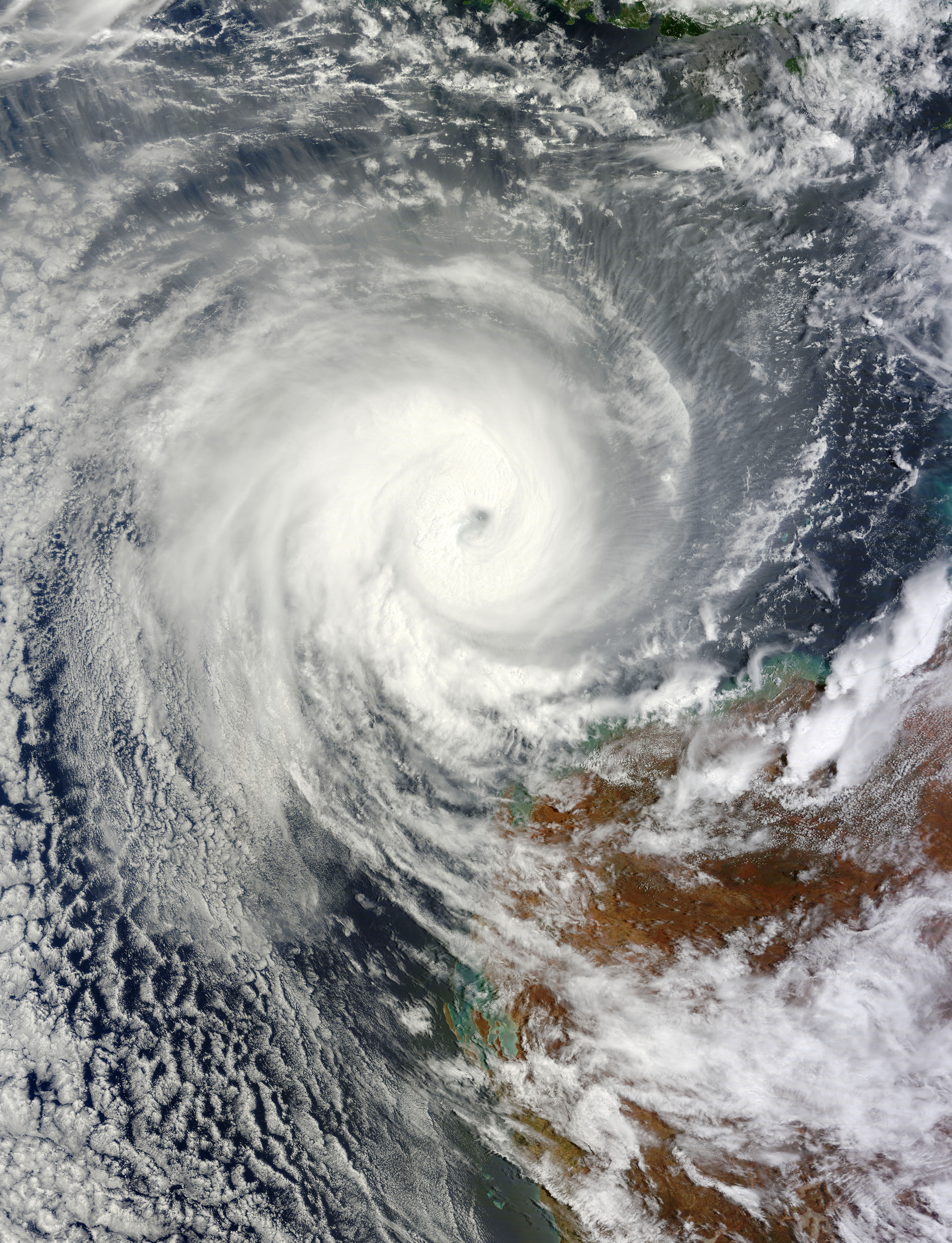
Cyclone Narelle

January was very active, featuring fourteen systems, with seven of them being named.

Tropical cyclones formed in January 2013
Storm name	Dates active	Max wind km/h (mph)	Pressure (hPa)	Areas affected	Damage (USD)	Deaths	Refs
Sonamu (Auring)	January 1–10	95 (60)	990	Philippines, Vietnam, Borneo	Minimal	2	
Narelle	January 5–15	195 (120)	930	East Timor, Indonesia, Western Australia, South Australia, Tasmania	$74 thousand	14	
Bising	January 6–13	55 (35)	1002	Philippines	$37 thousand	none	
07F	January 7–9	Not specified	1003	French Polynesia	none	none	
08F	January 9–15	45 (30)	999	Wallis and Futuna, Fiji, Tonga	none	none	
06U	January 12–16	Not specified	1004	none	none	none	
Emang	January 12–17	65 (40)	994	none	none	none	
Garry	January 14–27	150 (90)	965	Tokelau, Wallis and Futuna, Samoan Islands, Cook Islands	Minor	None	
Oswald	January 17–28	65 (40)	991	Queensland, New South Wales	$2.52 billion	6	
Peta	January 20–23	85 (50)	988	Western Australia	Minor	none	
10F	January 26–28	Not specified	1000	Solomon Islands	none	none	
11F	January 26–30	55 (35)	995	none	none	none	
Felleng	January 26–February 3	165 (105)	935	Seychelles, Madagascar, Mauritius, Réunion	$10 million	18	
TL	January 30–31	Not specified	Not specified	none	none	none	

=== February ===
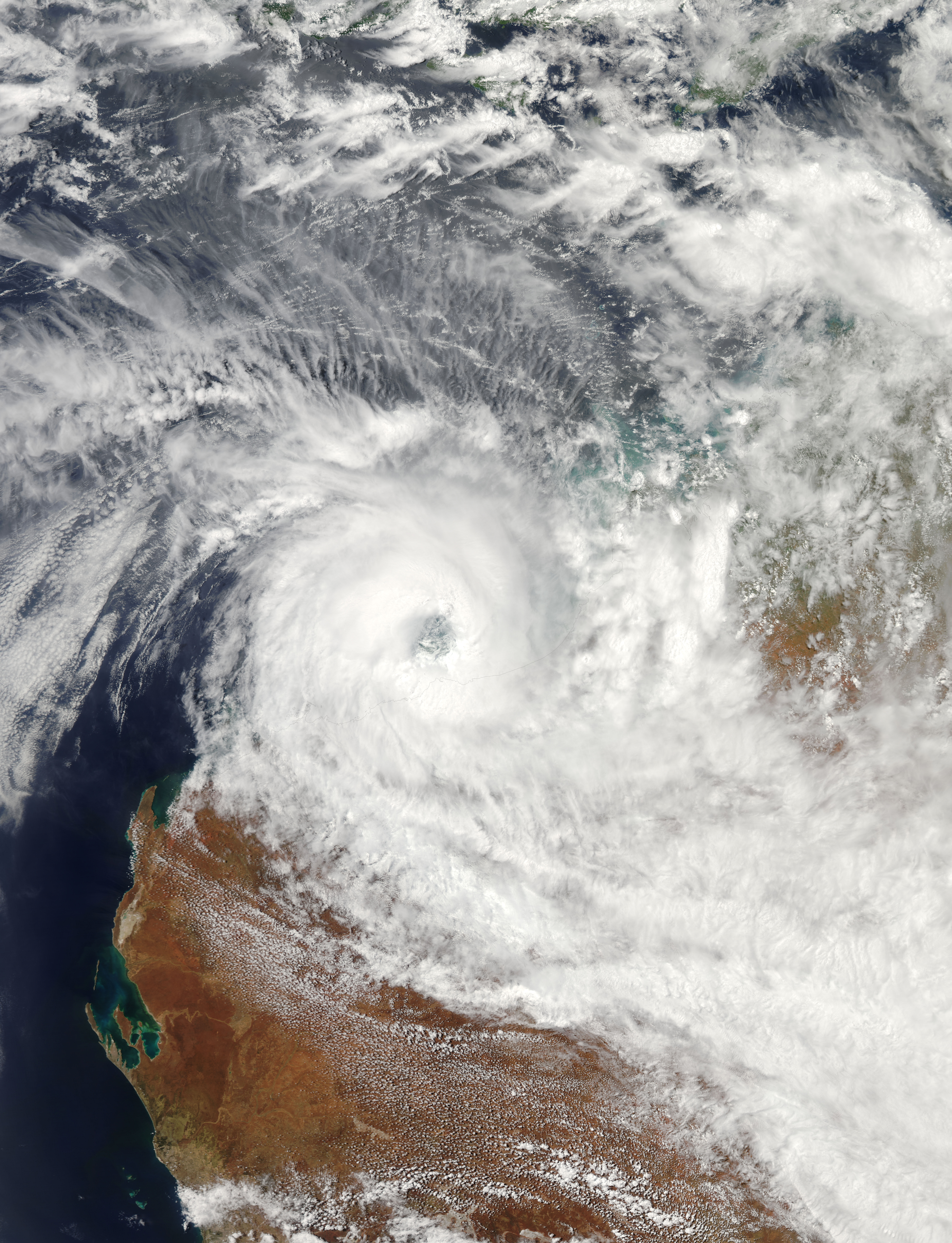
Cyclone Rusty

February was slightly above-average, featuring eleven systems, with five of them being named.

Tropical cyclones formed in February 2013
Storm name	Dates active	Max wind km/h (mph)	Pressure (hPa)	Areas affected	Damage (USD)	Deaths	Refs
12F	February 2	Not specified	1000	French Polynesia	None	None	
13F	February 3–7	Not specified	997	Cook Islands	None	None	
TL	February 6–10	Not specified	Not specified	None	None	None	
Haley	February 7–11	75 (45)	990	Cook Islands	None	None	
Gino	February 11–15	140 (85)	953	None	None	None	
Haruna	February 18–25	150 (90)	960	Mozambique, Madagascar	Unknown	39	
Shanshan (Crising)	February 18–23	65 (40)	1002	Philippines, Borneo	$275 thousand	11	
15F	February 21–24	Not specified	1004	Fiji	None	None	
Rusty	February 22–28	165 (105)	944	Western Australia, South Australia	$510 million	None	
11U	February 22–28	55 (35)	995	Cocos (Keeling) Islands	None	None	
16F	February 28 –March 7	Not specified	998	New Caledonia, Vanuatu, Fiji	None	None	

=== March ===
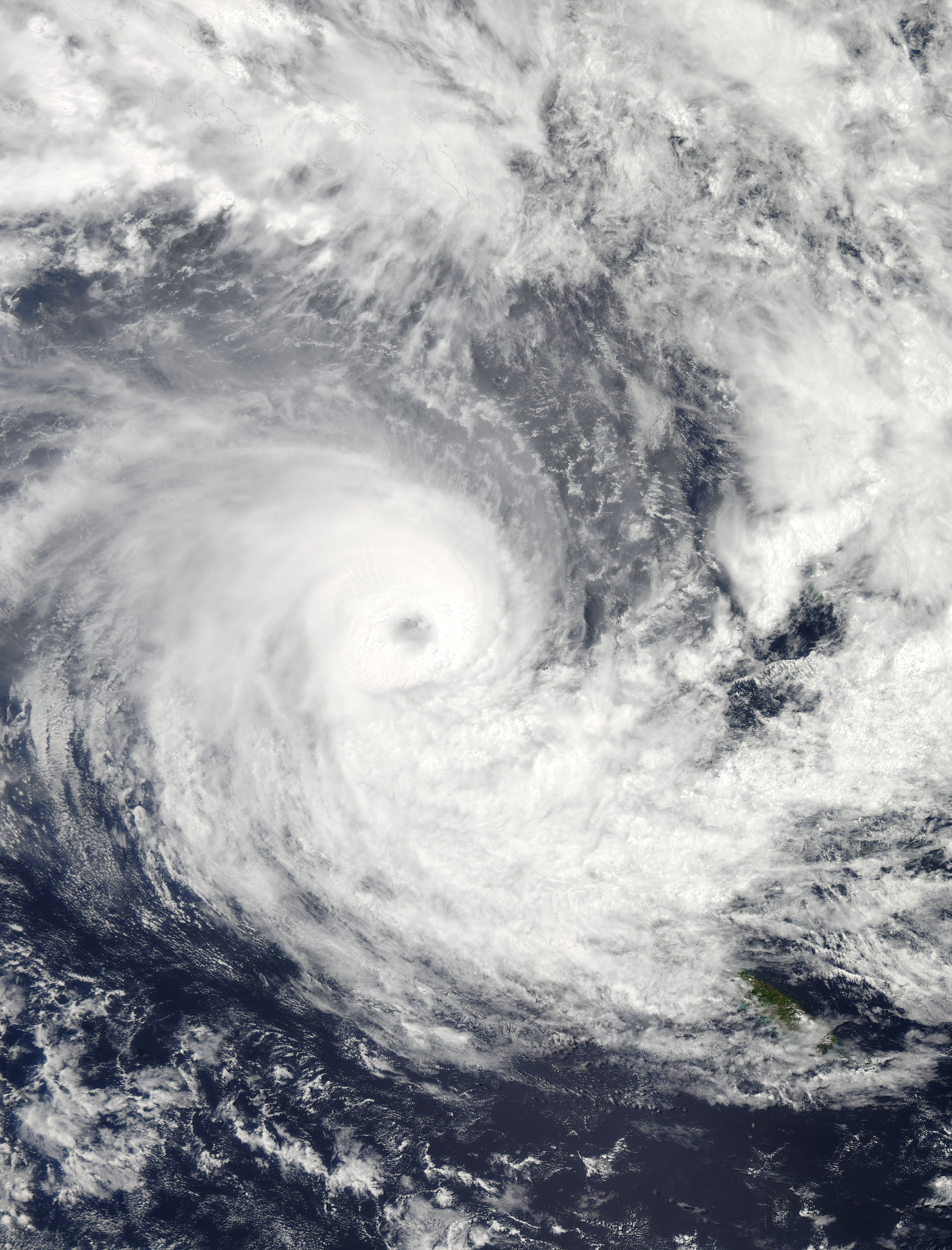
Cyclone Sandra

March was slightly below-average featuring eight systems, of which only two were named.

Tropical cyclones formed in March 2013
Storm name	Dates active	Max wind km/h (mph)	Pressure (hPa)	Areas affected	Damage (USD)	Deaths	Refs
Sandra	March 5–14	185 (115)	930	New Caledonia, New Zealand	None	None	
Tim	March 10–20	95 (60)	985	Northern Territory, Queensland	Minimal	None	
18F	March 12–15	Not Specified	1003	Fiji	None	None	
19F	March 14–17	Not specified	1006	Vanuatu	None	None	
15U	March 17–23	65 (40)	1000	None	None	None	
TD	March 20–21	Not Specified	1006	Philippines	None	None	
16U	March 25 – April 2	Not Specified	1003	Northern Territory	None	None	
20F	March 27–30	Not specified	1004	None	None	None	

=== April ===
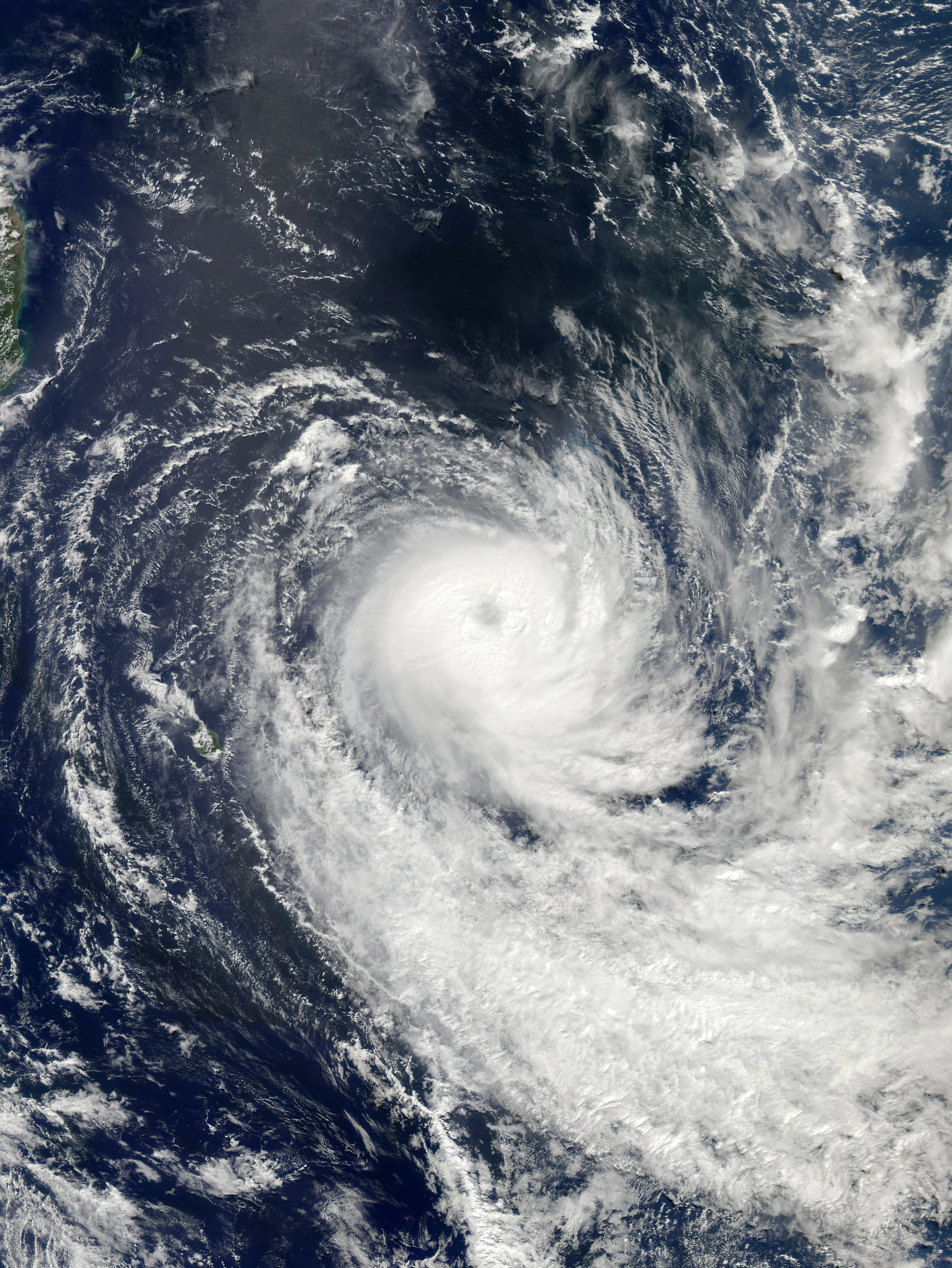
Cyclone Imelda

April was slightly below-average, with six systems forming, with three of them being named.

Tropical cyclones formed in April 2013
Storm name	Dates active	Max wind km/h (mph)	Pressure (hPa)	Areas affected	Damage (USD)	Deaths	Refs
Imelda	April 5–16	150 (90)	960	St. Brandon Mauritius, Rodrigues	None	None	
Victoria	April 7–12	140 (85)	971	Western Australia	None	None	
TL	April 10–15	Not Specified	1006	None	None	None	
21F	April 20–27	Not Specified	1007	None	None	None	
Zane	April 27– May 1	120 (75)	983	Papua New Guinea, Queensland	None	None	
22F	April 28 – May 1	Not Specified	993	None	None	None	

=== May ===
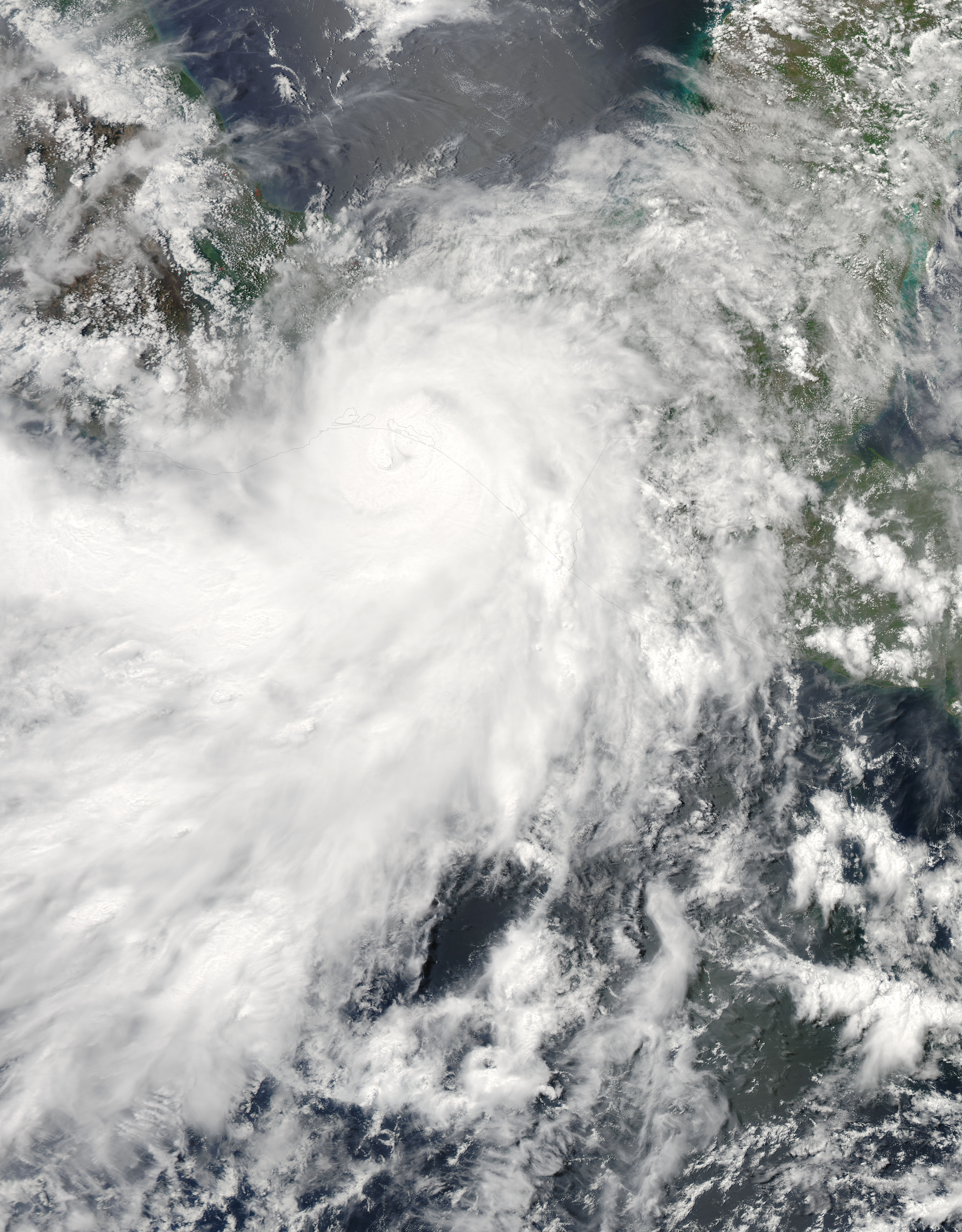
Hurricane Barbara

Tropical cyclones formed in May 2013
Storm name	Dates active	Max wind km/h (mph)	Pressure (hPa)	Areas affected	Damage (USD)	Deaths	Refs
Jamala	May 9–11	75 (45)	992	None	None	None	
Viyaru	May 10–17	85 (50)	990	Indonesia, Thailand, Sri Lanka, India, Bangladesh, Myanmar	>$35.3 million	107	
TL	May 14	Not specified	1007	None	None	None	
Alvin	May 15–17	95 (60)	1000	None	None	None	
Barbara	May 28–30	130 (80)	983	Central America, Mexico	$358 million	5	
BOB 02	May 29–31	45 (30)	990	India, Bangladesh	None	None	

=== June ===
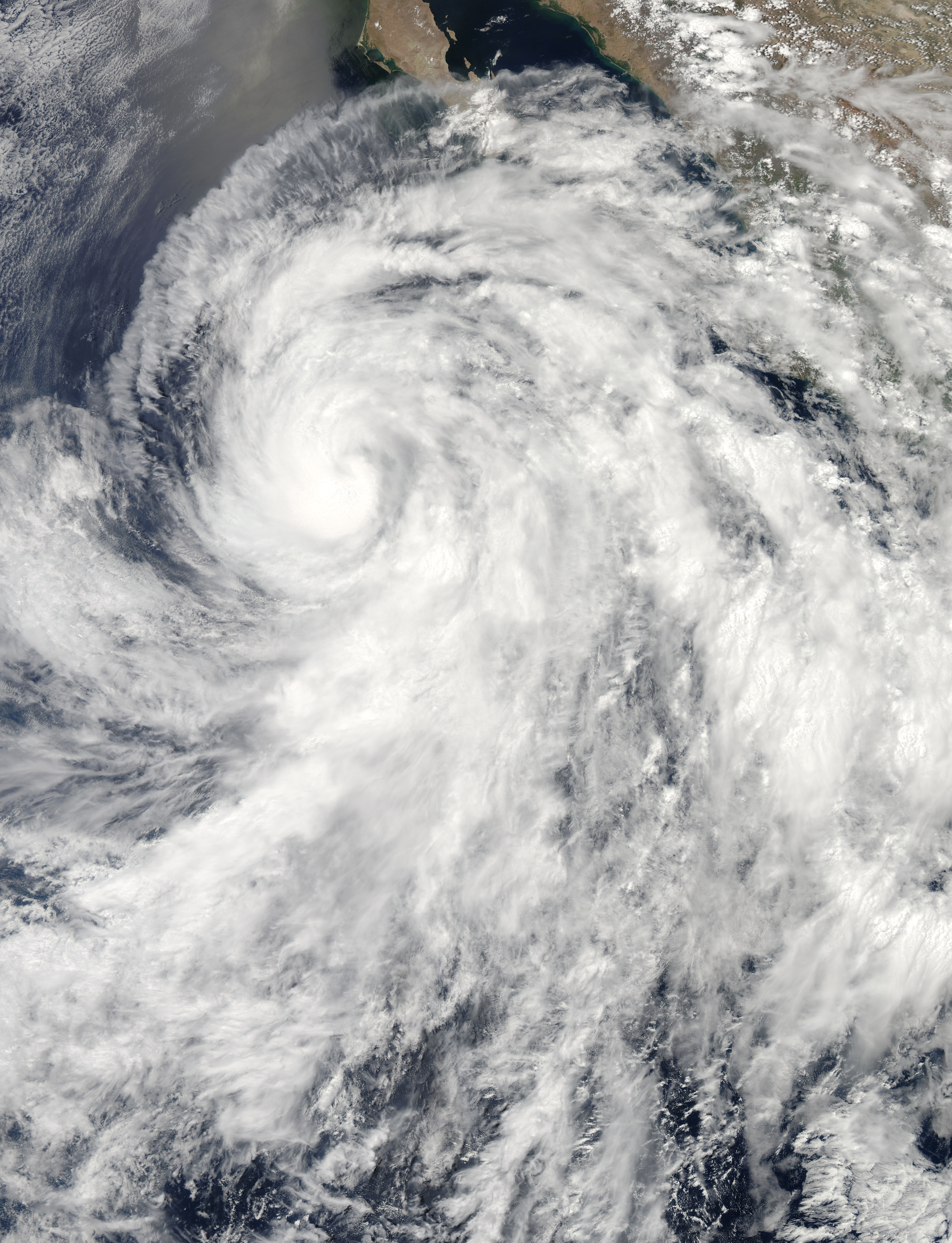
Hurricane Cosme

Tropical cyclones formed in June 2013
Storm name	Dates active	Max wind km/h (mph)	Pressure (hPa)	Areas affected	Damage (USD)	Deaths	Refs
Andrea	June 5–7	100 (65)	992	Yucatán Peninsula, Cuba, Eastern United States, Atlantic Canada	$86,000	4	
Yagi (Dante)	June 6–12	85 (50)	990	Philippines Japan	None	None	
TD	June 14–15	55 (35)	994	China	None	None	
Leepi (Emong)	June 16–21	75 (45)	994	Philippines Taiwan, Ryukyu Islands, South Korea, Japan	None	None	
Barry	June 17–20	75 (45)	1003	Mexico, Belize	Minimal	5	
TL	June 19–25	Not Specified	1000	None	None	None	
Bebinca (Fabian)	June 19–24	75 (45)	990	Philippines China, Vietnam	$13.6 million	1	
Cosme	June 23–27	140 (85)	980	Mexico	Minimal	4	
Rumbia (Gorio)	June 27 – July 2	95 (60)	985	Philippines China	$191 million	7	
Dalila	June 29 – July 7	130 (80)	984	Mexico	Minimal	None	

=== July ===
Typhoon Soulik

Tropical cyclones formed in July 2013
Storm name	Dates active	Max wind km/h (mph)	Pressure (hPa)	Areas affected	Damage (USD)	Deaths	Refs
Erick	July 4–9	130 (80)	983	Mexico	Minimal	2	
Soulik (Huaning)	July 7–14	185 (115)	925	Philippines, China, Taiwan, Japan	$600 million	15	
Chantal	July 7–10	100 (65)	1003	Lesser Antilles, Puerto Rico, Hispaniola	$10 million	1	
Cimaron (Isang)	July 15–18	75 (45)	1000	Philippines Taiwan, China	$322 million	6	
TD	July 18–20	55 (35)	1000	None	None	None	
Dorian	July 23– August 3	95 (60)	1002	The Bahamas, Florida	None	None	
Flossie	July 25–30	110 (70)	994	Hawaii	$24.000	None	
Jebi (Jolina)	July 28 – August 3	95 (60)	985	Philippines China, Vietnam, Laos, Thailand	$80.9 million	7	
BOB 03	July 30 – August 1	45 (30)	990	India, Bangladesh	None	None	
Gil	July 30 – August 6	140 (85)	985	None	None	None	

=== August ===
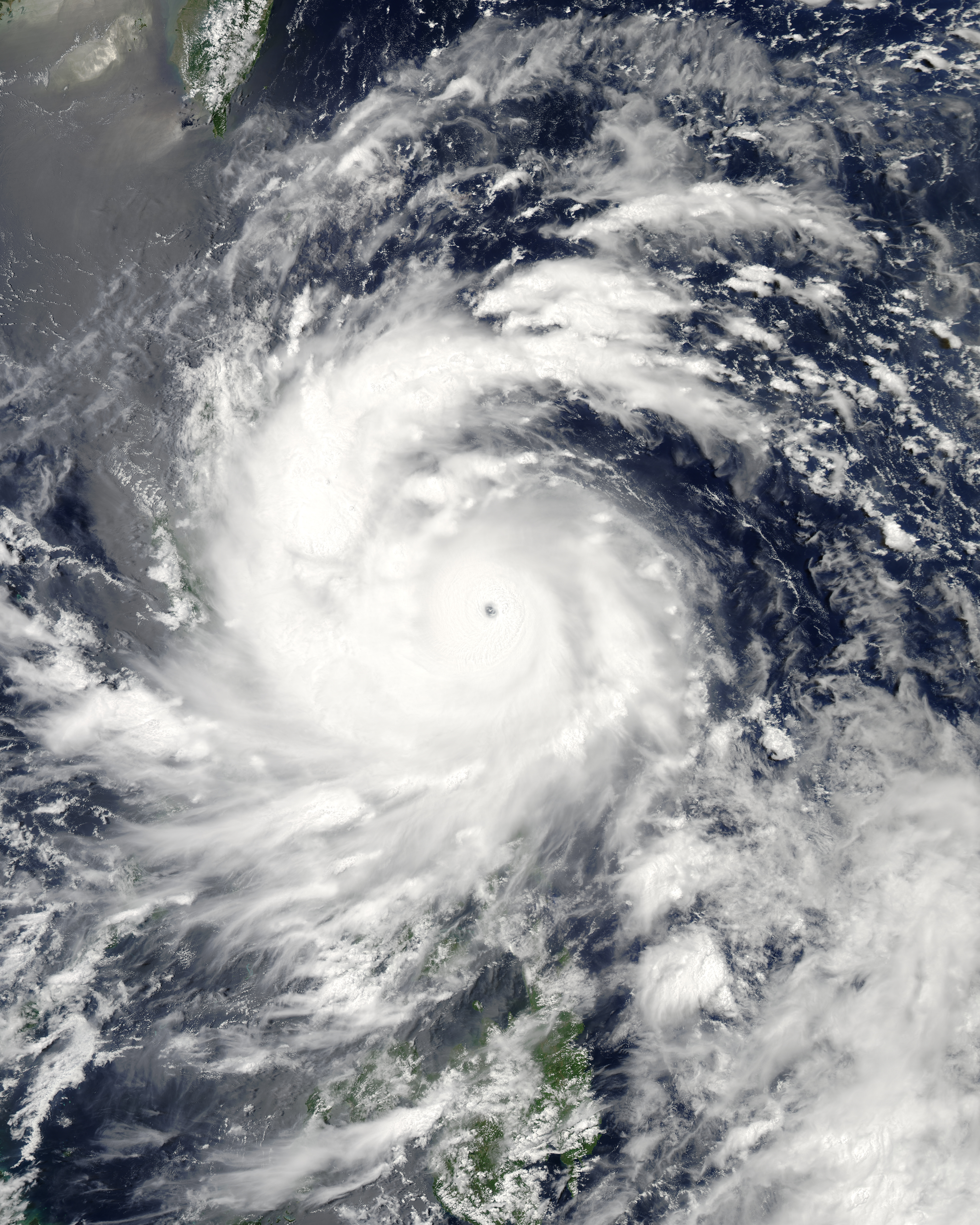
Typhoon Utor

Tropical cyclones formed in August 2013
Storm name	Dates active	Max wind km/h (mph)	Pressure (hPa)	Areas affected	Damage (USD)	Deaths	Refs
Henriette	August 3–11	165 (105)	976	None	None	None	
Mangkhut (Kiko)	August 5–8	75 (45)	992	Philippines China, Vietnam, Laos, Thailand	$10 million	4	
Utor (Labuyo)	August 8–18	195 (120)	925	Philippines China	$3.55 billion	97	
TD	August 10–12	Not Specified	1002	None	None	None	
13W	August 15–19	55 (35)	996	Japan, China	None	None	
Erin	August 15–18	75 (45)	1006	Cape Verde	Minimal	None	
Trami (Maring)	August 16–24	110 (70)	965	Philippines Taiwan, Japan, China	$598 million	34	
Pewa	August 16–26	100 (65)	990	None	None	None	
Unala	August 19	65 (40)	1000	None	None	None	
Three-C	August 19–20	55 (35)	1008	None	None	None	
LAND 01	August 20–23	45 (30)	990	India	None	4	
Ivo	August 22–25	75 (45)	997	Mexico, Western United States	$30.000	1	
Fernand	August 25–26	95 (60)	1001	Mexico	$1 million	14	
Kong-rey (Nando)	August 25–30	100 (65)	980	Philippines Taiwan, China, Japan, South Korea	$21.2 million	9	
TD	August 27–29	Not Specified	1002	None	None	None	
TD	August 27–30	Not Specified	1008	None	None	None	
Juliette	August 28–29	100 (65)	997	Mexico	Minimal	1	
Yutu	August 29 –September 5	65 (40)	1002	None	None	None	
Kiko	August 30 – September 2	120 (75)	989	Baja California	None	None	
Toraji	August 31 – September 4	95 (60)	985	Taiwan, Japan	Minimal	3	

=== September ===
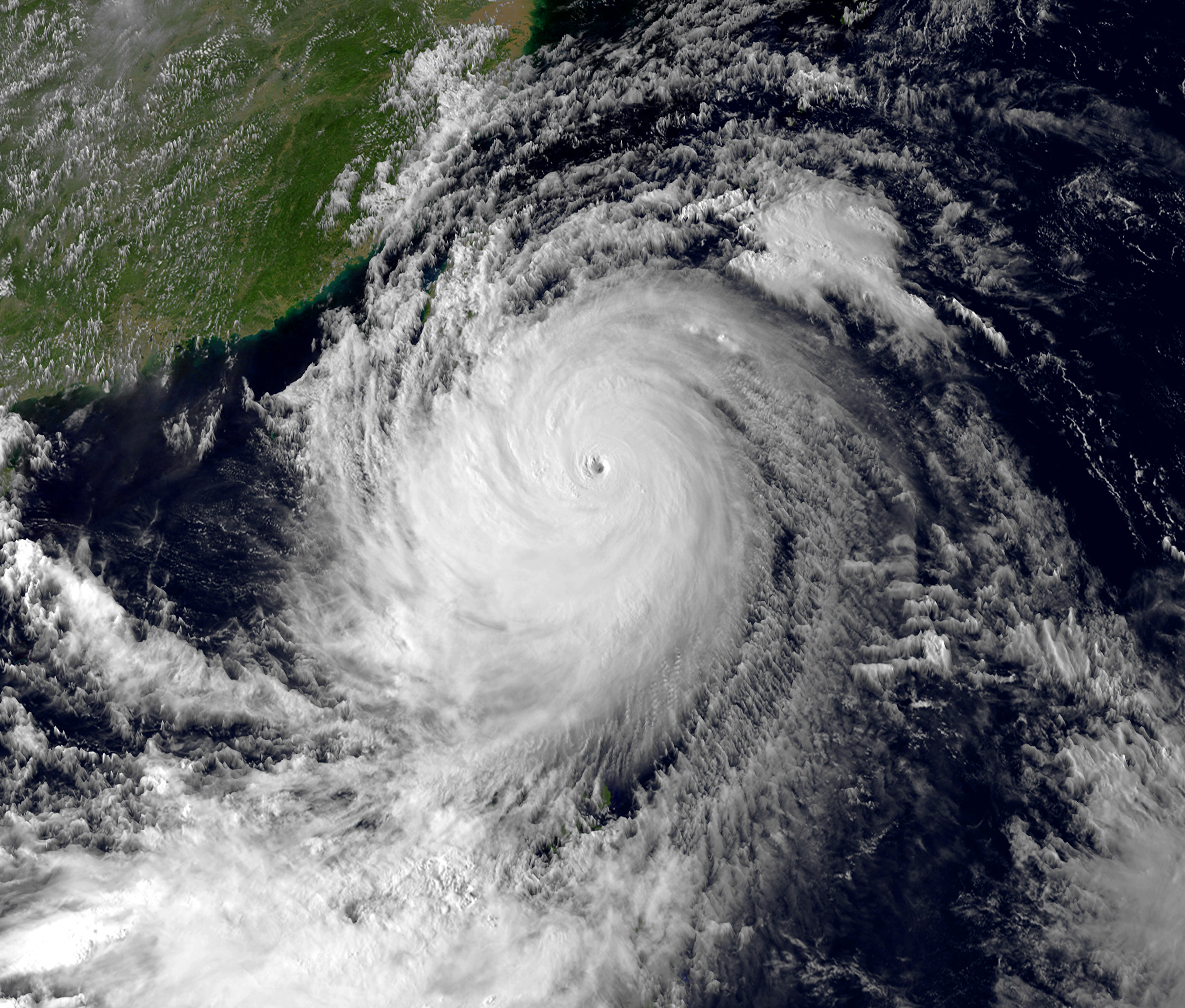
Typhoon Usagi

Tropical cyclones formed in September 2013
Storm name	Dates active	Max wind km/h (mph)	Pressure (hPa)	Areas affected	Damage (USD)	Deaths	Refs
Gabrielle	September 4–13	100 (65)	1003	Lesser Antilles, Puerto Rico, Hispaniola, Bermuda, Atlantic Canada	Minimal	None	
Lorena	September 5–7	85 (50)	1002	Mexico	Minimal	None	
Eight	September 6–7	55 (35)	1008	Mexico	None	None	
Humberto	September 8–19	150 (90)	979	Cape Verde	Minimal	None	
Man-yi	September 11–16	120 (75)	960	Japan, Kamchatka Peninsula	$1.62 billion	6	
Ingrid	September 12–17	140 (85)	983	Mexico, Texas	$1.5 billion	23	
Manuel	September 13–19	120 (75)	983	Mexico, Texas	$4.2 billion	123	
18W	September 15–21	55 (35)	996	Vietnam, Laos, Thailand	$79.7 million	23	
Usagi (Odette)	September 16–24	205 (125)	910	Philippines, Taiwan, China	$4.32 billion	39	
Pabuk	September 19–27	110 (70)	965	Northern Mariana Islands	None	None	
TD	September 22–23	Not Specified	1010	None	None	None	
Wutip (Paolo)	September 25 – October 1	120 (75)	965	Philippines China, Vietnam, Laos, Thailand	$524 million	25	
Sepat	September 29 – October 2	75 (45)	992	Japan, Kamchatka Peninsula	None	None	
Jerry	September 29 – October 3	85 (50)	1005	Azores	None	None	
Fitow (Quedan)	September 29 – October 7	140 (85)	960	Philippines Ryukyu Islands, Taiwan, China	$10.4 billion	12	

=== October ===
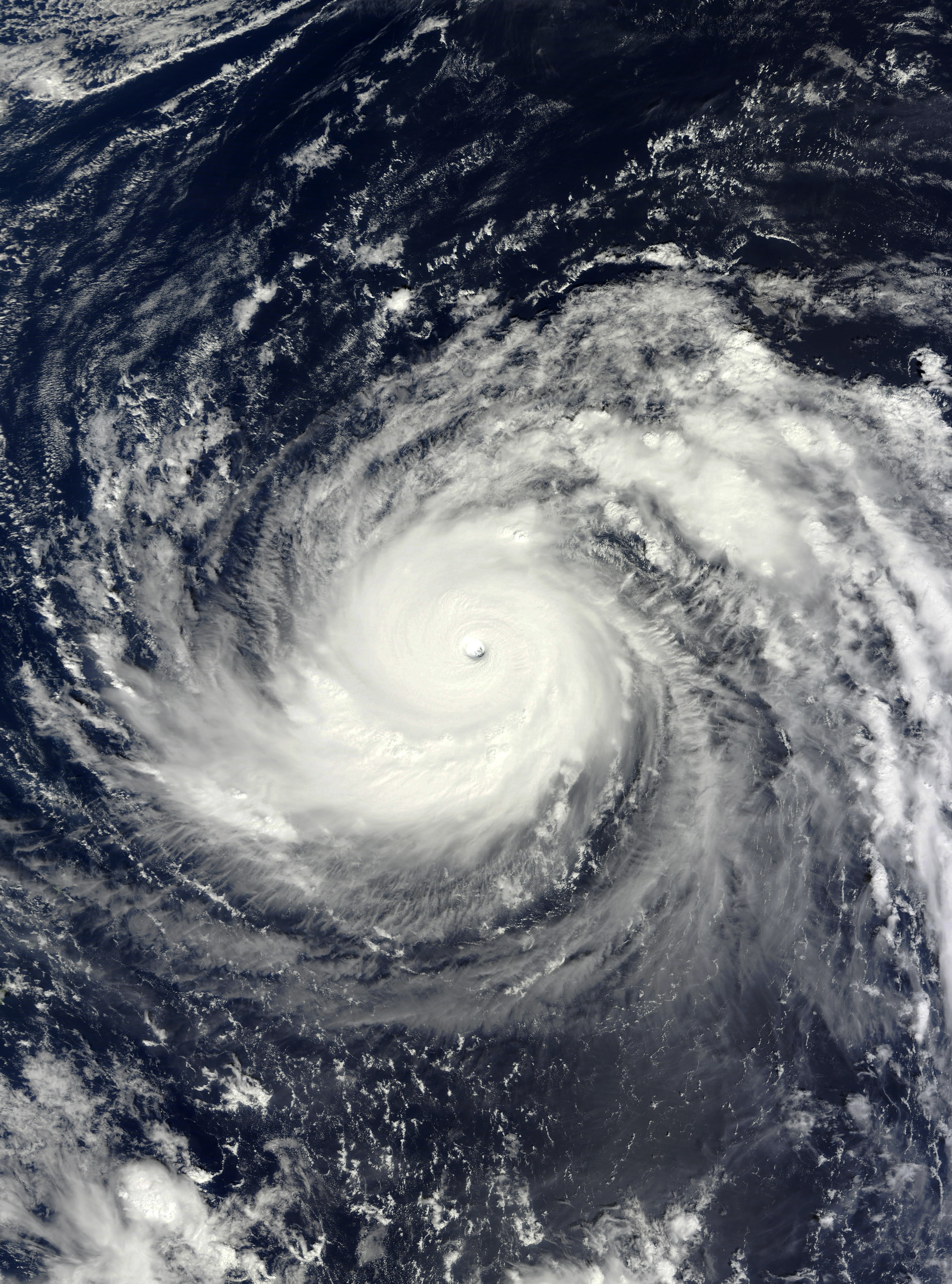
Typhoon Lekima

Tropical cyclones formed in October 2013
Storm name	Dates active	Max wind km/h (mph)	Pressure (hPa)	Areas affected	Damage (USD)	Deaths	Refs
Danas (Ramil)	October 1–9	165 (105)	935	Northern Mariana Islands, Guam, Ryukyu Islands, Japan, South Korea	$228 thousand	None	
TD	October 2–4	Not Specified	1006	None	None	None	
Karen	October 3–6	100 (65)	998	Yucatán Peninsula, Gulf Coast of the United States, Eastern United States	Minimal	None	
Phailin	October 4–14	215 (130)	940	Malay Peninsula, Andaman and Nicobar Islands, Myanmar, India, Nepal	$4.26 billion	45	
Narda	October 6–10	100 (65)	997	None	None	None	
Nari (Santi)	October 8–16	140 (85)	965	Philippines China, Vietnam, Laos, Cambodia, Thailand	$161 million	87	
Wipha (Tino)	October 9–16	165 (105)	930	Northern Mariana Islands, Guam, Japan, Kamchatka Peninsula, Alaska	$405 million	41	
Octave	October 12–15	100 (65)	994	Baja California	Minimal	13	
Priscilla	October 14–16	75 (45)	1001	None	None	None	
Francisco (Urduja)	October 15–26	195 (120)	920	Guam, Japan	$150 thousand	None	
27W	October 17–22	55 (35)	1002	None	None	None	
01F	October 19–20	Not Specified	1004	Solomon Islands, Vanuatu	None	None	
Lekima	October 19–26	215 (130)	905	Northern Mariana Islands, Iwo Jima, Japan	None	None	
02F	October 19–23	Not Specified	1002	Kiribati, Vanuatu	None	None	
Raymond	October 20–30	205 (125)	951	Mexico	Minimal	None	
03F	October 21–22	Not Specified	1005	Solomon Islands	None	None	
Lorenzo	October 21–24	85 (50)	1000	None	None	None	
01	October 23–27	65 (40)	997	Chagos Archipelago	None	None	
04F	October 25–27	Not Specified	1007	Solomon Islands	None	None	
Krosa (Vinta)	October 27 – November 5	140 (85)	970	Philippines Taiwan, China, Vietnam	$6.4 million	4	

=== November ===
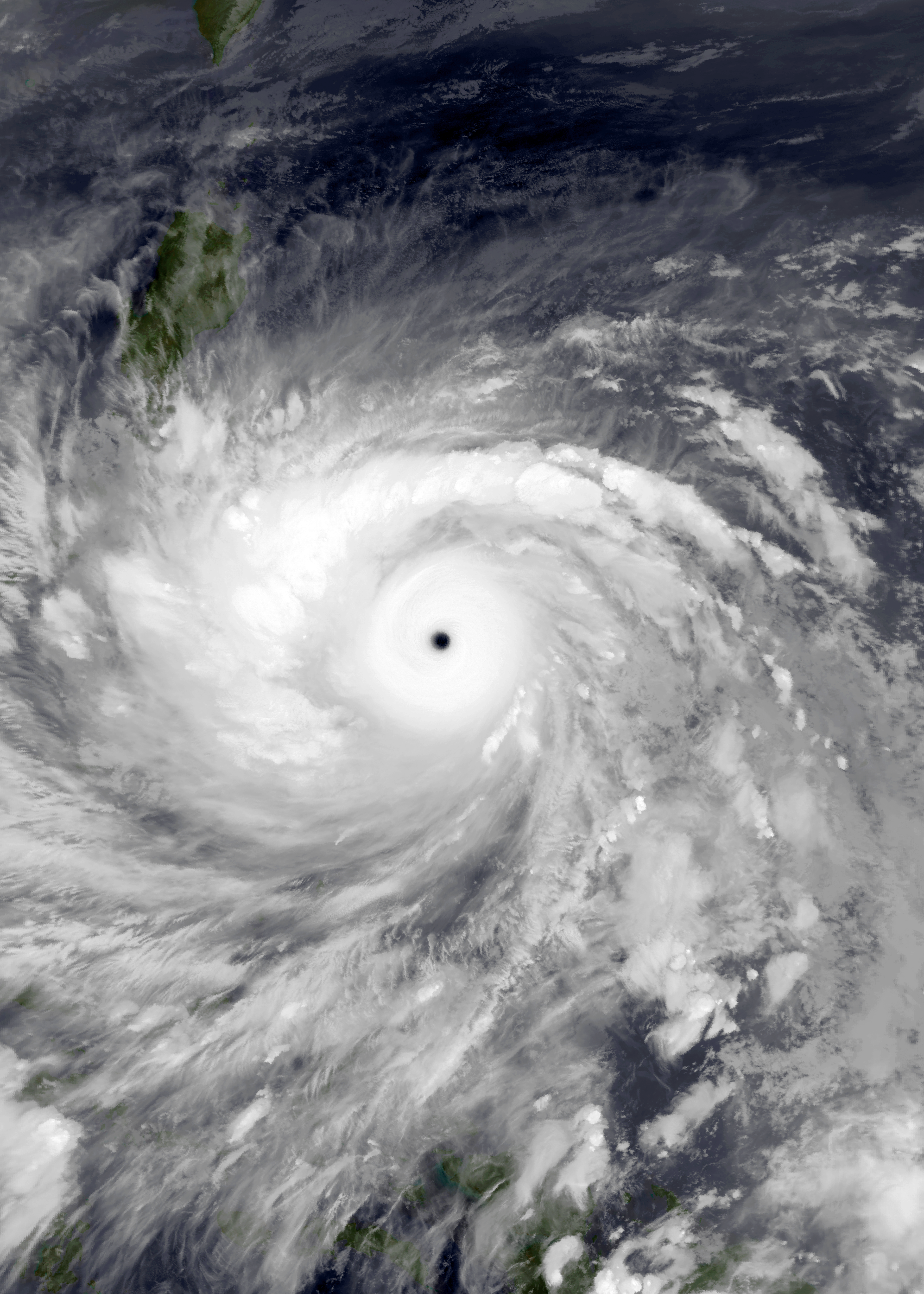
Typhoon Haiyan

Tropical cyclones formed in November 2013
Storm name	Dates active	Max wind km/h (mph)	Pressure (hPa)	Areas affected	Damage (USD)	Deaths	Refs
Sonia	November 1–4	75 (45)	1002	Mexico	Minimal	None	
30W (Wilma)	November 2–17	55 (35)	1003	Philippines, Vietnam, Cambodia, Thailand, Myanmar, Andaman and Nicobar Islands, Sri Lanka, India, Yemen	Minimal	16	
Haiyan (Yolanda)	November 3–11	230 (145)	895	Philippines, China, Vietnam, Laos	$2.98 billion	6,352	
ARB 01	November 8–11	55 (35)	1002	Somaliland, Somalia, Ethiopia	Unknown	140	
Podul (Zoraida)	November 11–15	65 (40)	1000	Philippines, Vietnam, Laos, Cambodia	$72 million	44	
TD	November 17–18	Not Specified	1006	Vietnam	None	None	
Melissa	November 18–21	100 (65)	980	Azores	None	None	
Helen	November 19–23	100 (65)	990	India	$796 million	11	
Lehar	November 19–28	140 (85)	980	Indonesia, Malaysia, Thailand, Andaman and Nicobar Islands, India	Minimal	None	
Alessia	November 20 – December 1	85 (50)	991	Indonesia, Western Australia, Northern Territory, Queensland	None	None	

=== December ===
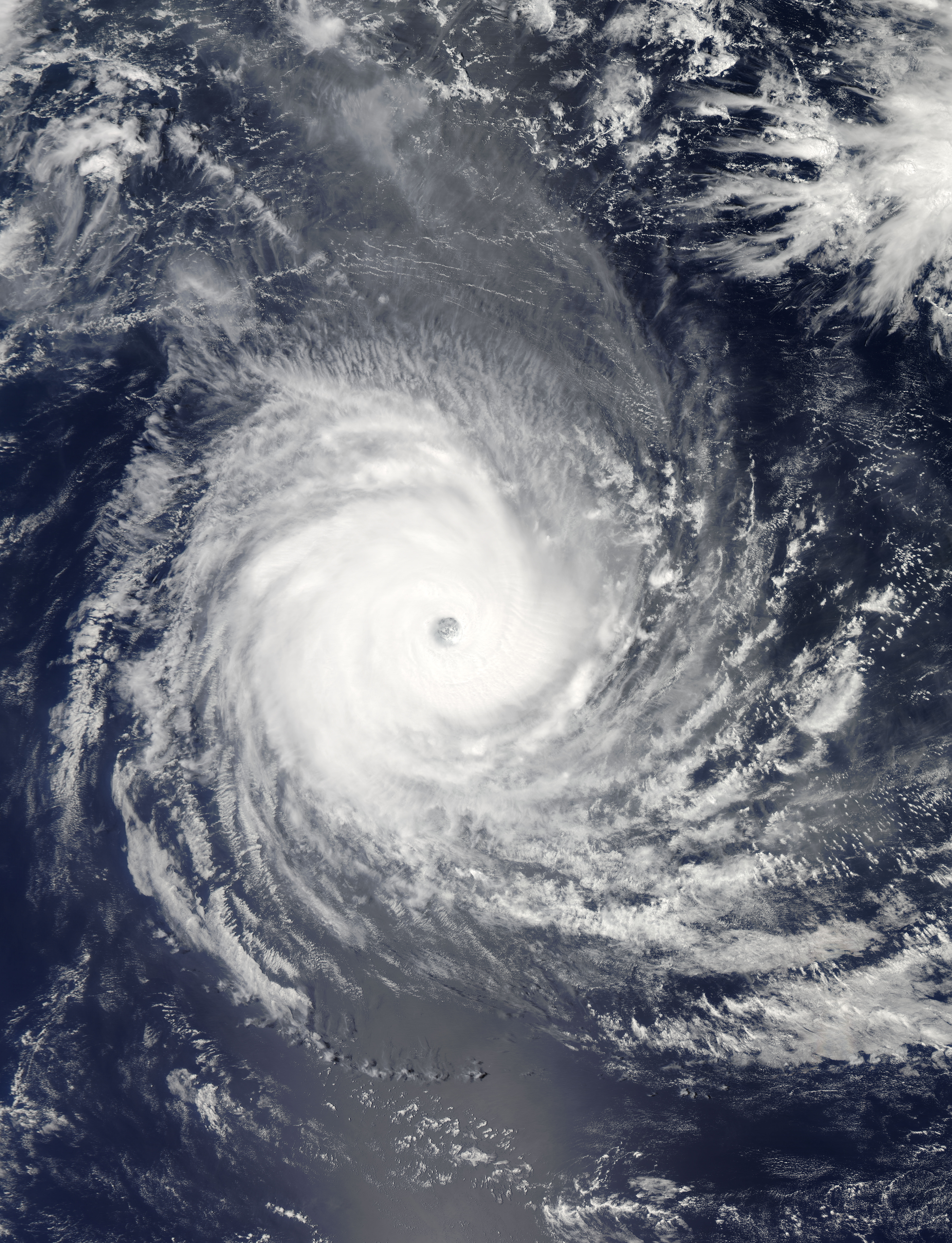
Cyclone Bruce

Tropical cyclones formed in December 2013
Storm name	Dates active	Max wind km/h (mph)	Pressure (hPa)	Areas affected	Damage (USD)	Deaths	Refs
33W	December 3	Not specified	1006	None	None	None	
Unnamed	December 5–7	85 (50)	997	Azores	None	None	
Madi	December 6–13	120 (75)	986	Sri Lanka, India, Maldives	Unknown	None	
05F	December 9–13	Not Specified	999	Fiji, Tonga	None	None	
Amara	December 14–27	205 (125)	935	Rodrigues	None	None	
Bruce	December 16–23	220 (140)	920	Cocos (Keeling) Islands	None	None	
Christine	December 22 – January 1	165 (105)	948	Western Australia, South Australia, Victoria	Minimal	None	
06F	December 23–29	Not Specified	1003	Vanuatu	None	None	
Bejisa	December 27 –January 4	175 (110)	950	Seychelles, Réunion, Mauritius	>$89.2 million	1	

== Global effects ==
There are a total of seven tropical cyclone basins that tropical cyclones typically form in this table, data from all these basins are added.

Season name		Areas affected	Systems formed	Named storms	Hurricane-force tropical cyclones	Damage (2013 USD)	Deaths	Ref.
North Atlantic Ocean (Note: The wind speeds for this tropical cyclone/basin are based on the Saffir Simpson Scale which uses 1-minute sustained winds.)		Yucatán Peninsula, Greater Antilles, Eastern United States, Atlantic Canada, Central America, Yucatan Peninsula, Lesser Antilles, Lucayan Archipelago, Gulf Coast of the United States, Northeastern United States, Azores	15	14	2	$1.76 billion	56	
Eastern and Central Pacific Ocean		Central America, Southwestern Mexico, Eastern Mexico, Western Mexico, Baja California Peninsula, Western United States, Northwestern Mexico	21	20	9	≥$4.64 billion	181	
Western Pacific Ocean (Note: Only systems that formed either before or on December 31, 2013 are counted in the seasonal totals.)		Philippines, Vietnam, Borneo, Japan, China, Hong Kong, Taiwan, Ryukyu Islands, South Korea, Laos, Thailand, Okinawa, Kamchatka Peninsula, Northern Mariana Islands, Palau, Guam, Malay Peninsula, Cambodia, Alaska, Myanmar, Chuuk, Yap, Indonesia, Malaysia	45	29	15	$26.379 billion	6,836	
North Indian Ocean (Note: The wind speeds for this tropical cyclone/basin are based on the IMD Scale which uses 3-minute sustained winds.)		India, Andaman and Nicobar Islands, Bangladesh, Sri Lanka, Southern India, Nepal, Myanmar, Thailand, Maldives, Indonesia, Somalia, Ethiopia, Yemen, Malay Peninsula	9	5	4	$5.09 billion	345	
South-West Indian Ocean	January – June (Note: Only systems that formed either on or after January 1, 2013 are counted in the seasonal totals.) (Note: The wind speeds for this tropical cyclone are based on Météo-France, which uses wind gusts.)	Seychelles, Madagascar, Mauritius, Réunion Island, Mozambique, St Brandon, Rodrigues	6	6	4	Unknown	34	
South-West Indian Ocean	July – December	Chagos Archipelago, Rodrigues, Seychelles, Réunion, Mauritius	3	3	2	$89.2 million	1	
Australian region	January – June	East Timor, Indonesia, Western Australia, South Australia, Tasmania, Queensland, New South Wales. Cocos (Keeling) Island, Northern Territory, Papua New Guinea	17	7	5	$3.03 billion	20	
Australian region	July – December	Western Australia, Northern Territory, Queensland, Cocos Islands, South Australia, Victoria	4	3	2	Unknown	—N/a	
South Pacific Ocean	January – June	Tokelau, Wallis and Futuna, Samoan Islands, Cook Islands, Solomon Islands, French Polynesia, New Caledonia, Vanuatu, Fiji, Tonga, New Zealand	15	2	—N/a	Unknown	—N/a	
South Pacific Ocean	July – December	Solomon Islands, Vanuatu, Kiribati, Fiji, Tonga	6	—N/a	—N/a	—N/a	—N/a	
Worldwide			141 (Note: The sum of the number of systems in each basin will not equal the number shown as the total. This is because when systems move between basins, it creates a discrepancy in the actual number of systems.)	89	43	$41 billion	7,473	

== See also ==
- Tropical cyclones by year
- List of earthquakes in 2013
- Tornadoes of 2013

== Notes ==
^{1}The "strength" of a tropical cyclone is measured by the minimum barometric pressure, not wind speed. Most meteorological organizations rate the intensity of a storm by this figure, so the lower the minimum pressure of the storm, the more intense or "stronger" it is considered to be.
^{2} Only systems that formed either on or after January 1, 2013 are counted in the seasonal totals.
^{3} Only systems that formed either before or on December 31, 2013 are counted in the seasonal totals.
^{4} The wind speeds for this tropical cyclone/basin are based on the IMD Scale which uses 3-minute sustained winds.
^{5} The wind speeds for this tropical cyclone/basin are based on the Saffir Simpson Scale which uses 1-minute sustained winds.
^{6}The wind speeds for this tropical cyclone are based on Météo-France which uses gust winds.
