= Cyclone Bejisa =

South-West Indian tropical cyclone in 2012–13

Intense Tropical Cyclone Bejisa
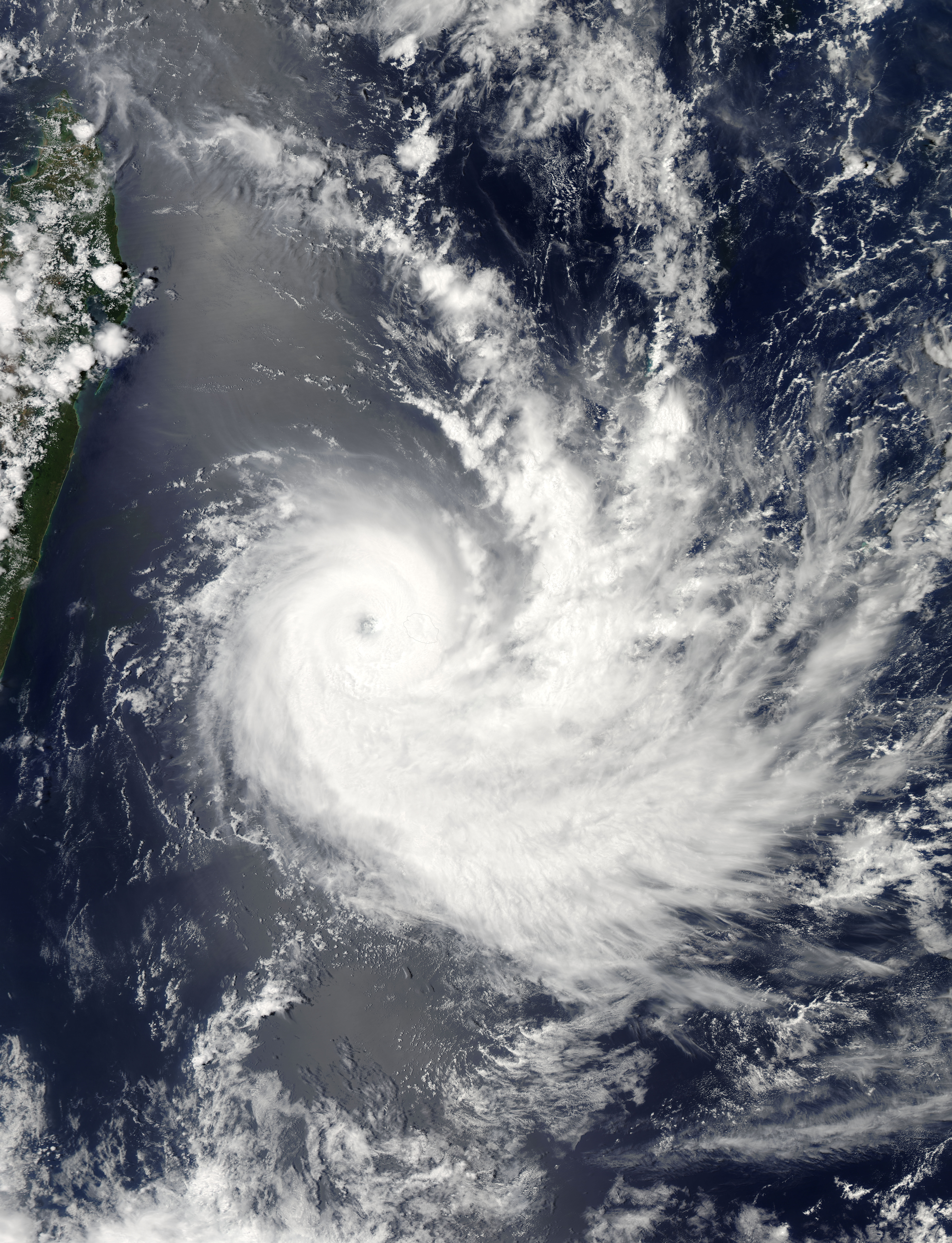
- Cyclone Bejisa shortly before peak intensity on 2 January

Meteorological history
- Formed: 27 December 2013
- Remnant low: 4 January 2014
- Extratropical: 6 January 2014
- Dissipated: 7 January 2014

Intense tropical cyclone
- 10-minute sustained (MFR)
- Highest winds: 175 km/h (110 mph)
- Highest gusts: 250 km/h (155 mph)
- Lowest pressure: 950 hPa (mbar); 28.05 inHg

Category 4-equivalent tropical cyclone
- 1-minute sustained (SSHWS/JTWC)
- Highest winds: 215 km/h (130 mph)
- Lowest pressure: 944 hPa (mbar); 27.88 inHg

Overall effects
- Fatalities: 1 total
- Damage: >$89.2 million (2014 USD)
- Areas affected: Seychelles; Réunion; Mauritius
- IBTrACS
- Part of the 2013–14 South-West Indian Ocean cyclone season

Intense Tropical Cyclone Bejisa was a powerful tropical cyclone that affected the islands of Réunion and Mauritius in early January 2014. In late December 2013, a tropical disturbance developed to the north of Madagascar. With favorable conditions, the low developed into a disturbance and soon into a depression on 28 December. The system continued to develop and intensified into Moderate Tropical Storm Bejisa on 29 December, with rapid intensification occurring. It developed into an Intense Tropical Cyclone on 30 December, reaching peak maximum sustained winds of 165 km/h (103 mph). (Note: All measurements of maximum sustained wind are measured or estimated over a period of ten minutes unless otherwise noted.) Due to an eyewall replacement cycle, Bejisa weakened, but re-intensified to a secondary peak of 160 km/h (99 mph) on 1 January. Increased wind shear weakened the eyewall, which passed within 15 km (9.3 mi) of Réunion. After having moved generally south-southeastward for much of its duration, Bejisa turned to the southwest on 3 January, by which time it had weakened to tropical storm status. It became a post-tropical cyclone on 5 January after the convection weakened over the center, and Bejisa became extratropical the next day as it meandered southwest of Madagascar.

In its formative stages, Bejisa brought heavy rainfall to Seychelles, and it also dropped rainfall in Mauritius and Madagascar. Effects were worst on Réunion, where wind gusts were around 130–150 km/h (81–93 mph) along the coast. The storm also dropped torrential rainfall, peaking at 800 mm (31 in) at a volcano in Cilaos. The winds and rains downed many trees and power lines, which blocked roads and left 181,000 people without power. About 49% of the island also lost water supply. Bejisa left heavy damage to the agriculture industry, mainly to vanilla and sugar cane, totaling €62 million (US$84.8 million) in losses. The commune of Saint-Paul sustained moderate damage, with losses estimated at €3 million (US$4.1 million). Bejisa killed one person on the island due to head trauma, and there were 16 injuries. Later, the cyclone produced high waves in South Africa.

== Meteorological history ==
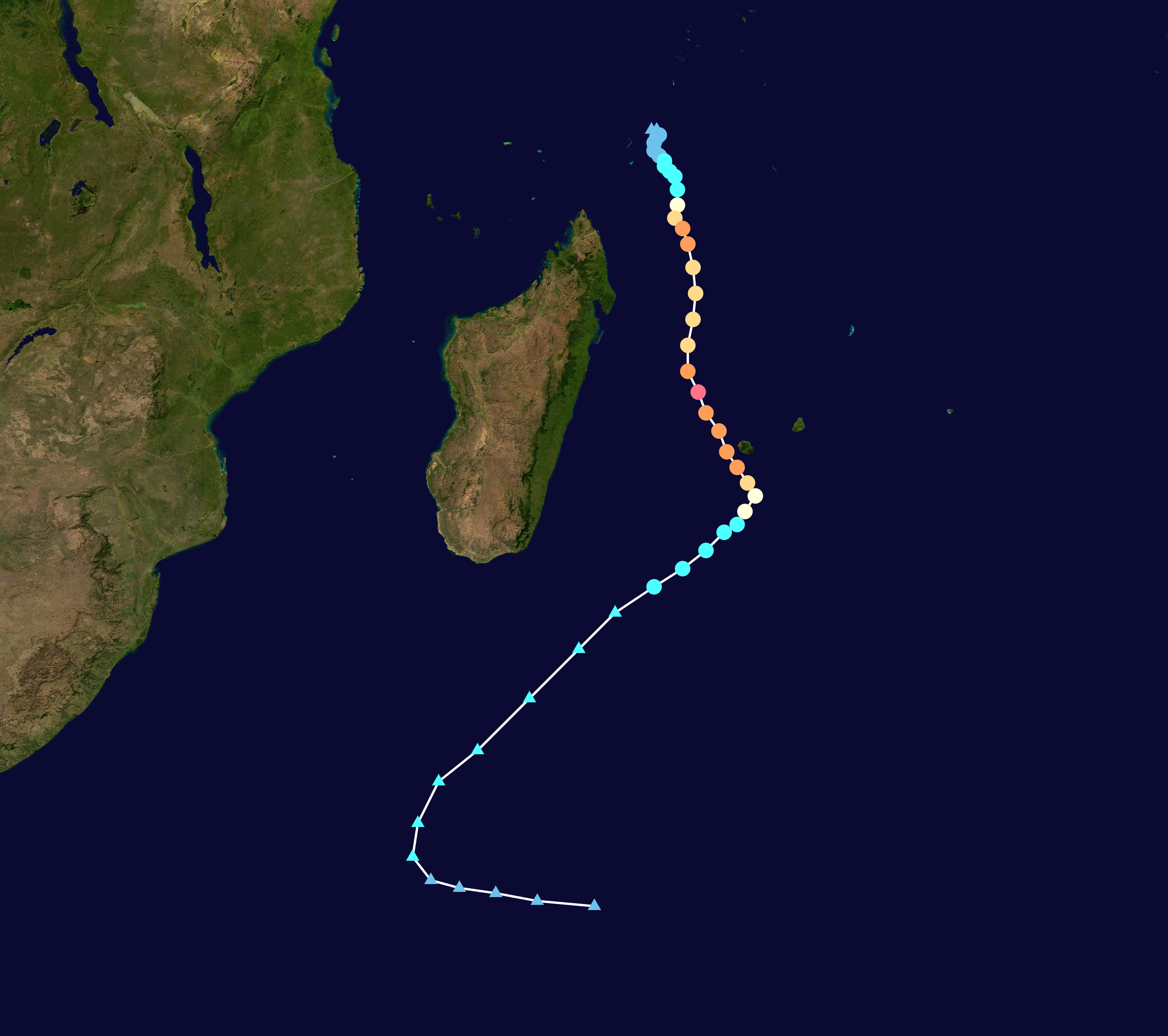
Map plotting the storm's track and intensity, according to the Saffir–Simpson scale Map key Saffir–Simpson scale Tropical depression (≤38 mph, ≤62 km/h) Tropical storm (39–73 mph, 63–118 km/h) Category 1 (74–95 mph, 119–153 km/h) Category 2 (96–110 mph, 154–177 km/h) Category 3 (111–129 mph, 178–208 km/h) Category 4 (130–156 mph, 209–251 km/h) Category 5 (≥157 mph, ≥252 km/h) Unknown Storm type Tropical cyclone Subtropical cyclone Extratropical cyclone, remnant low, tropical disturbance, or monsoon depression

In late December 2013, computer forecast models began to predict the development and cyclogenesis of a disturbance within the monsoon trough north of Madagascar. At 1800 UTC on 27 December, the Joint Typhoon Warning Center (JTWC) noted a discrete area of disturbed weather approximately 1,350 km (840 mi) north-northwest of Réunion that corresponded with model forecasts and had the potential to develop. Accompanied by a low-level circulation center, the monitored storm complex developed rainbands about its southern periphery the following day. At 12:00 UTC on 28 December, Météo-France deemed the system sufficiently organized to be considered a tropical disturbance, the fourth system to be given such a classification by the agency that season. Upon its designation, the disturbance was analyzed to have an unusually high barometric pressure, based on nearby weather station observations. Météo-France projected for the system to peak as a tropical cyclone before slightly weakening and impacting the Mascarene Islands.

Tracking southward, the disturbance steadily organized. As a result of wind shear, the system's low-level circulation center remained partially exposed, though the shearing conditions were expected to lessen At 00:00 UTC on 29 December, the disturbance was upgraded to a tropical depression. At 18:00 UTC that day, the depression intensified to moderate tropical storm intensity, thus receiving the name Bejisa by the Mauritius Meteorological Services. This coincided with the improving satellite appearance of the storm's central dense overcast. Intensification subsequently quickened, and at 06:00 UTC the next day Bejisa was considered to be a severe tropical storm. Concurrently a strengthening ridge in the mid-levels of the troposphere began to steer the storm towards the south-southeast. Following the development of a small pinhole eye, Bejisa was upgraded to tropical cyclone status at 12:00 UTC on 30 December, followed by intense tropical cyclone status six hours thereafter, with peak winds of 165 km/h (103 mph). In addition, the JTWC estimated 1-minute winds of 195 km/h (121 mph), utilizing the Dvorak technique to estimate the intensity. The agency noted that decreasing wind shear, favorable outflow, and warm sea surface temperatures allowed for the intensification. At that time of the peak winds, Bejisa was located about 825 km (513 mi) north-northwest of Réunion.

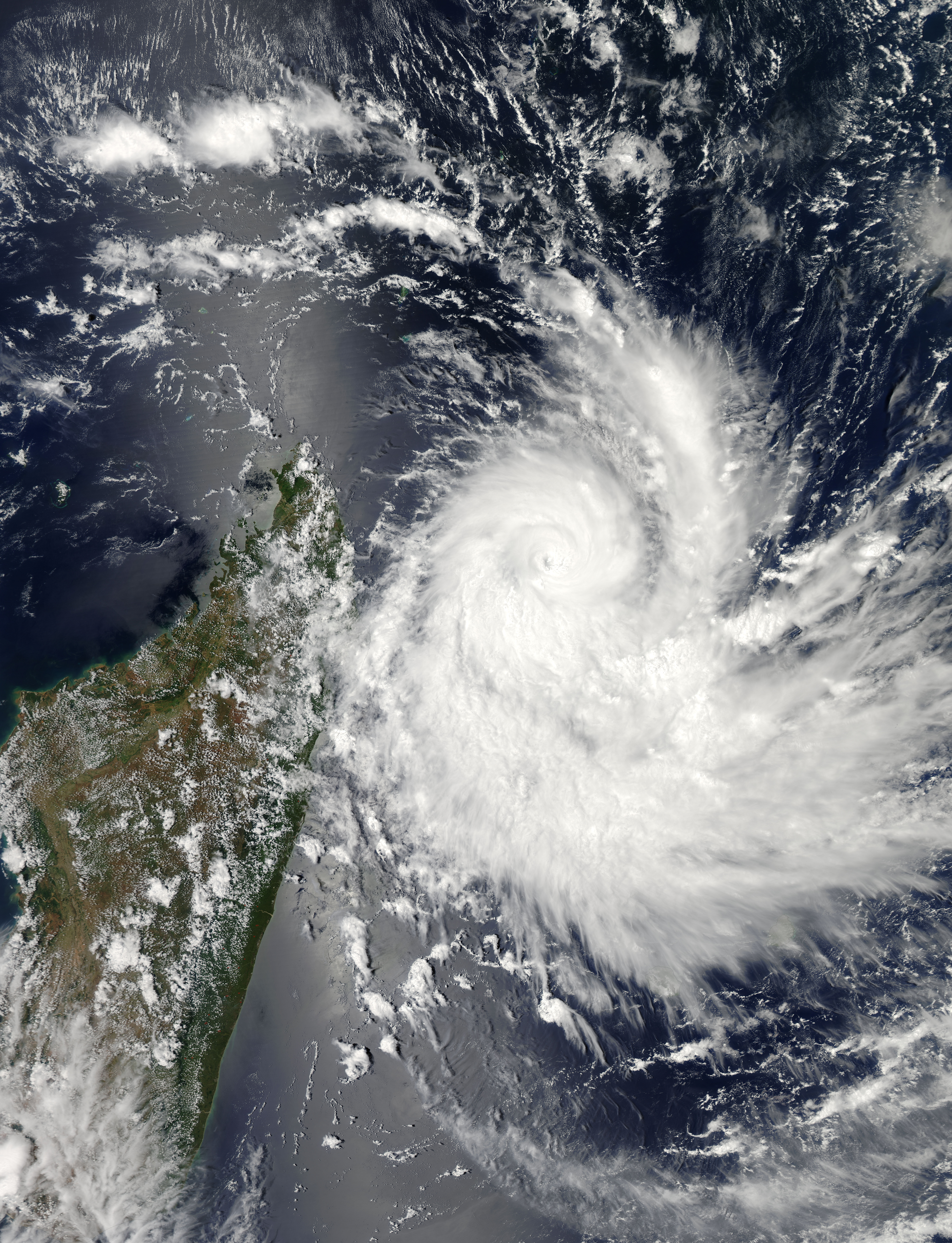
Cyclone Bejisa at initial peak intensity near Madagascar on December 31

The intensification phase of Bejisa was short-lived, as an eyewall replacement cycle resulted in a slight deterioration and fluctuation of the storm's organization and structure. By 31 December, the system weakened below intense tropical cyclone status as the eye became less organized. When the eyewall replacement cycle completed, the eye became larger and the winds increased. Later that day, Bejisa passed about 125 km (78 mi) west of Tromelin Island. On the next day, the cyclone attained a secondary peak intensity of 160 km/h (99 mph). However, increasing wind shear eroded the eyewall, which opened the eyewall in the northern periphery. Despite Météo-France assessing that Bejisa had weakened, at the same time the JTWC estimated that the cyclone had intensified further to reach peak 1-minute winds of 205 km/h (127 mph) on 2 January. That day, the storm's center passed within 155 km (96 mi) of Réunion while continuing to the southeast, and the eyewall passed within 15 km (9.3 mi) of the island. Continued wind shear stripped the convection, coupled with cooler water temperatures, and early on 3 January, Bejisa weakened below tropical cyclone status. By that time, the ridge to the southeast turned the storm to the southwest. A slight decrease in wind shear was expected to allow the convection to rebuild on 4 January, and the storm strengthened slightly. By 5 January, Bejisa began evolving into a post-tropical cyclone, with weaker convection over the center. That day, Météo-France reclassified Bejisa as a post-tropical depression, noting that the radius of maximum winds had expanded. On the same day, the JTWC discontinued warnings after assessing that the storm had become a subtropical cyclone. Increasing wind shear displaced the remaining convection west of the center, and Météo-France discontinued advisories on Bejisa on 6 January after the exposed circulation turned more to the south. The storm became extratropical and turned to the northeast, and was last noted on 7 January.

== Preparations and impact ==
Upon designation as a tropical disturbance, the predecessor to Cyclone Bejisa dropped heavy rainfall across the Seychelles. A weather station on Mahé observed 164 mm (6.5 in) of rain over a 24-hour period beginning on 27 December. The Farquhar Group were particularly affected, as the storm's incipient central region of convection remained over the area for an extended period of time.

Before the storm affected Réunion, Bejisa passed west of Tromelin Island, producing winds of 80 km/h (50 mph). The storm also produced heavy rainfall on Mauritius, reaching 156.3 mm (6.15 in) at Sans Souci. Bejisa spawned a tornado in Grand-Gaube and Poudre d’Or. Rainfall and gusty winds also affected portions of Madagascar. Later, Bejisa produced high waves along the coast of KwaZulu-Natal in South Africa.

=== Réunion ===
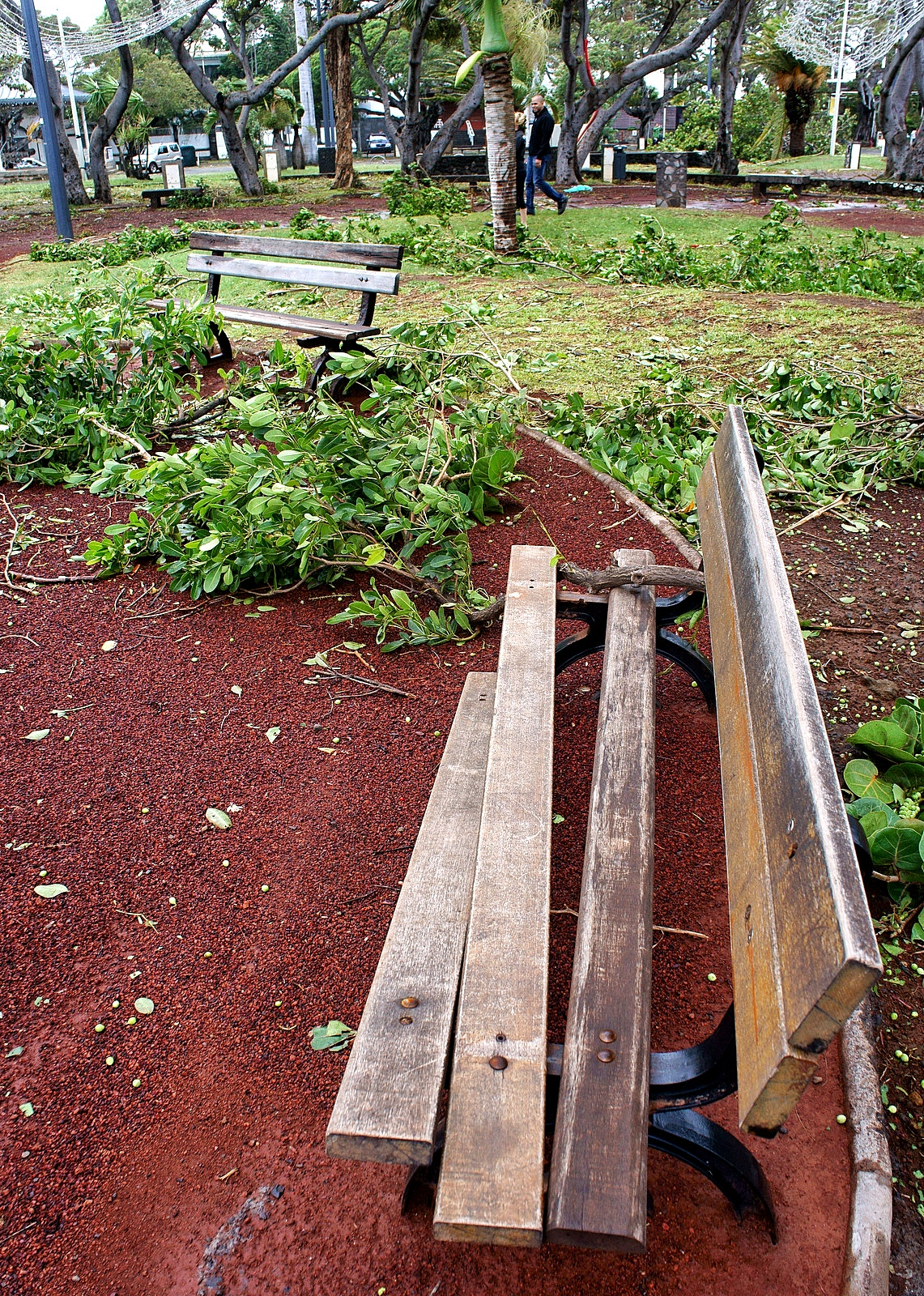
Damages in Saint-Denis after Cyclone Bejisa

In advance of the storm striking Réunion, officials advised residents to remain inside. Officials ordered residents in Saint-Leu along the coast to evacuate inland, and at least 300 people evacuated island-wide. The airport at Saint-Denis was closed, but reopened after the storm passed the island; several flights were canceled as a result. The main port was also closed, as were most childcare facilities, and mail service was suspended. Officials issued a red alert for the island, the first since Cyclone Dumile a year prior.

On Réunion, Bejisa produced strong wind gusts, averaging 130–150 km/h (81–93 mph) along the coast, and peaking in Saint-Louis. The winds downed numerous trees and power lines, leaving an estimated 181,000 people without electricity, and closing roads due to debris. All eight of the island's high tension lines were affected. Thirty percent of cell phone service was temporarily lost due to the outages. Torrential rains impacted much of the island, with a 24-hour total of 800 mm (31 in) measured at a volcano in Cilaos and 600 mm (24 in) measured in a nearby town. The rains caused rivers to rise, resulting in flooding. About 49 percent of homes lost their water supply. Tremendous agricultural damage occurred across Réunion, with some areas reporting 80–100 percent losses. Damage in the sector reached €62 million (US$84.8 million) alone, mostly to sugar cane and vanilla. The commune of Saint-Paul sustained moderate damage, with losses estimated at €3 million (US$4.1 million). Approximately €1 million (US$1.4 million) of this stemmed from wind and water damage to homes; 121 residences qualified for relief aid. Along the coast, a pier was destroyed, several boats were damaged, and roads were impacted. One person died from head trauma while 16 people were injured in various incidents. Two of the injuries were severe due to falling off ladders while attempting to secure their homes during the high winds.

In the wake of Bejisa, Électricité de France (EDF) deployed 500 personnel and 6 helicopters to restore power on the island. Within three days, roughly 160,000 residences were restored, considerably faster than previous restoration efforts in previous cyclones. By 9 January, all but a few dozen homes had power. In addition, water supply was largely restored within four days. A state of national disaster was declared for Réunion on 17 January, by Overseas Minister of France, Victorin Lurel. This declaration covered 16 towns on the island: Les Avirons, Cilaos, L'Entre-Deux, L'Étang-Salé, Petite-Île, La Plaine-des-Palmistes, Le Port, La Possession, Saint-Joseph, Saint-Leu, Saint-Louis, Saint-Paul, Saint-Pierre, Salazie, Le Tampon, and Trois-Bassins. Insurance estimates indicated that €25 million (US$34.2 million) was needed for relief funding. Farmers were eligible for compensation under the disaster declaration; however, many voiced their skepticism following a lack of follow-through by the government to supply funds after Tropical Cyclone Dumile in January 2013. Ultimately, the affected farmers had to indicate their taxed losses by 26 February to receive the assistance. By April 2014, all farmers affected by the declaration were compensated.

== See also ==
- Tropical cyclones in 2012 and 2013
- Cyclone Hollanda (1994) – a tropical cyclone which struck Réunion
- Cyclone Dina (2002) – another tropical cyclone that hit Réunion
