= Timeline of the 2013 Pacific typhoon season =

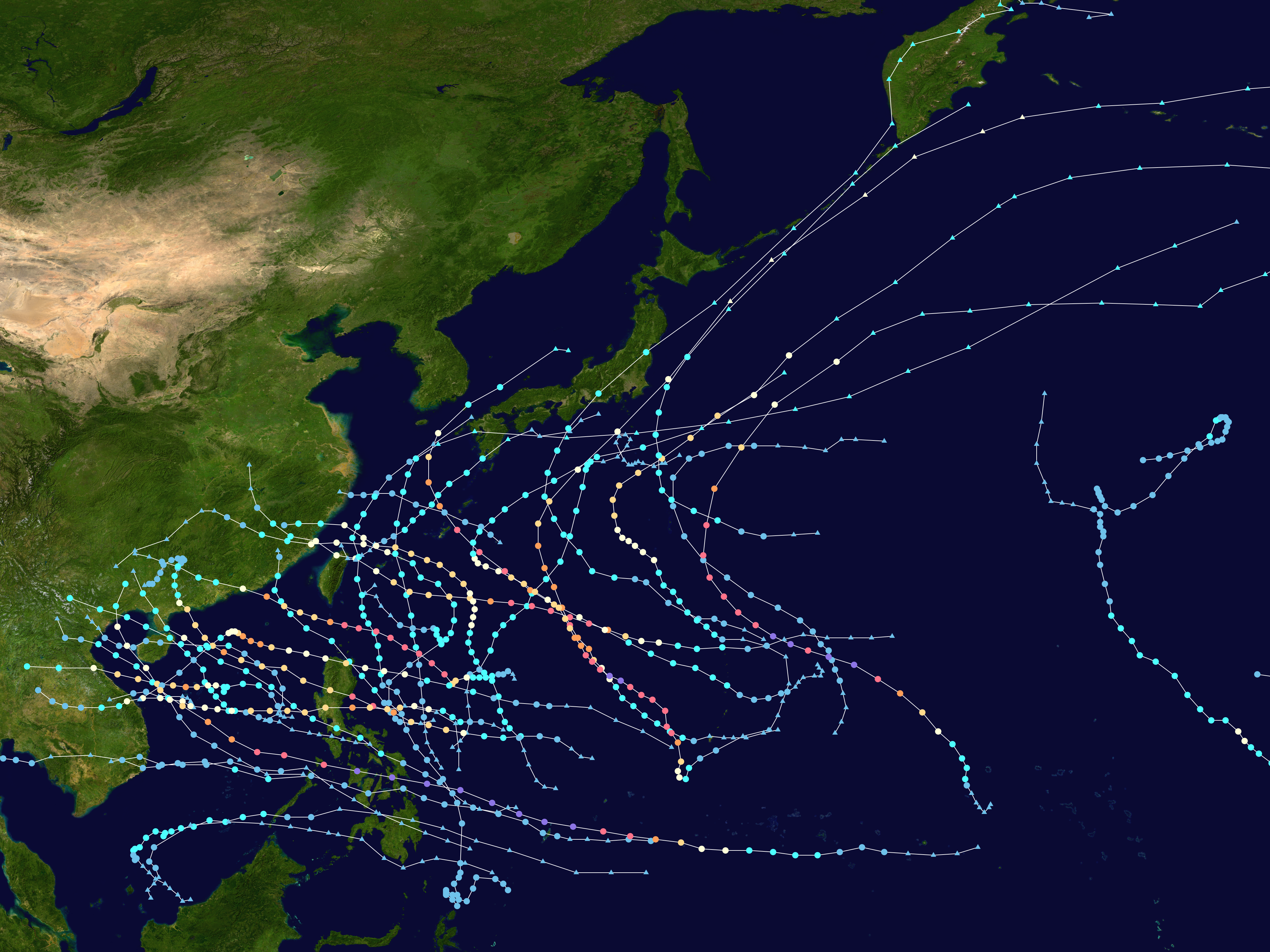
- Season summary map

Season boundaries
- First system formed: January 1, 2013
- Last system dissipated: December 4, 2013

Strongest system
- Name: Haiyan
- Maximum winds: 230 km/h (145 mph) (10-minute sustained)
- Lowest pressure: 895 hPa (mbar)

Longest lasting system
- Name: Bising
- Duration: 17 days
Storm articles
- Tropical Storm Bebinca (2013)
- Tropical Storm Rumbia (2013)
- Typhoon Soulik (2013)
- Tropical Storm Cimaron (2013)
- Tropical Storm Jebi (2013)
- Tropical Storm Mangkhut (2013)
- Typhoon Utor
- Tropical Storm Trami (2013)
- Typhoon Man-yi (2013)
- Tropical Depression 18W (2013)
- Typhoon Usagi (2013)
- Typhoon Wutip (2013)
- Typhoon Fitow
- Cyclone Phailin
- Typhoon Nari (2013)
- Typhoon Wipha (2013)
- Typhoon Francisco (2013)
- Typhoon Lekima (2013)
- Typhoon Krosa (2013)
- Typhoon Haiyan
- Tropical Storm Podul (2013)
- Cyclone Lehar

Most of the tropical cyclones of the 2013 Pacific typhoon season formed between May and November of that year. The scope of this article is the Pacific Ocean north of the equator, between 100°E and the International Date Line. Tropical storms which form in the Western Pacific basin are assigned a name by the Japan Meteorological Agency (JMA). Tropical depressions forming in this basin are given a number with a "W" suffix by the United States' Joint Typhoon Warning Center (JTWC). The Philippine Atmospheric, Geophysical and Astronomical Services Administration (PAGASA) assigns names to tropical cyclones (including tropical depressions) that enter or form in the Philippine area of responsibility, but these names are not in common use outside the Philippines.

During the season, 51 systems were designated as tropical depressions by the JMA, the PAGASA, the JTWC or other national meteorological and hydrological services, such as the China Meteorological Administration and the Hong Kong Observatory. Since it runs the Regional Specialized Meteorological Centre for the western Pacific Ocean, the JMA assigns names to tropical depressions if they intensify into a tropical storm. PAGASA assigns local names to tropical depressions which form within its area of responsibility. During this season, 25 systems entered (or formed) in the Philippine area of responsibility; 11 made landfall over the Philippines.

October was the most active month, with nine systems formed or active: eight typhoons and one weak storm. Three storms (Pewa, Unala and 03C) entered the Western Pacific basin in August. In early October and early November, two tropical depressions crossed the 100th meridian; one became Cyclone Phailin, the first cyclone since Cyclone Jal in 2010. Similar to October, in August 13 storms were counted by the JMA. Typhoon Haiyan, the strongest storm of the season, formed on early November, before rapidly intensifying and making landfall in the Philippines with estimated 1-minute sustained wind speeds of up to 190mph (305kph), which made it the strongest storm to make landfall based on sustained wind speeds at that time.

== Timeline of events ==
=== January ===
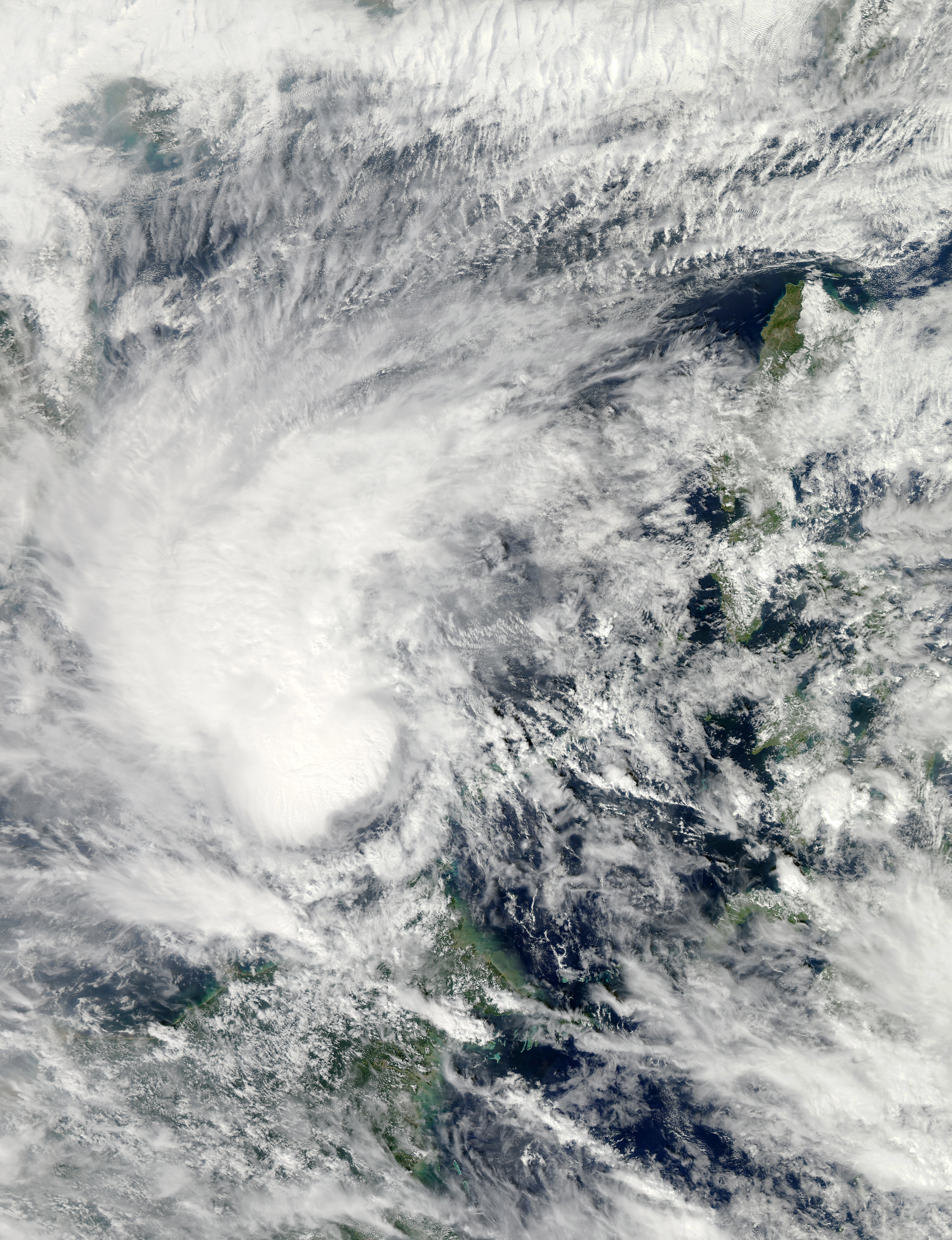
Sonamu shortly after being classified as a tropical storm on January 4

January 1

- 00:00 UTC – The JMA and the CMA report that a tropical depression, has developed about 1,090 km (675 mi) to the southwest of Hagåtña, Guam.

January 3

- 0300 UTC – PAGASA names the tropical depression that the JMA are monitoring; Auring.
- 12:00 UTC – The JMA, CMA and PAGASA all report that Tropical Depression Auring, has intensified into a tropical storm with the JMA naming it Sonamu.
- 12:00 UTC – The JTWC initiates advisories on Tropical Storm Sonamu (Auring) and designates it as Tropical Depression 01W.
- 2100 UTC – PAGASA reports that Tropical Storm Sonamu (Auring), has made landfall on the southern tip of the Philippine island Palawan.

January 4

- 00:00 UTC – The JTWC reports that Tropical Depression Sonamu (Auring) has intensified into a tropical storm.
- 09:00 UTC – PAGASA issues its final advisory on Tropical Storm Sonamu (Auring), as the system has moved out of the Philippine area of responsibility.

January 5

- 00:00 UTC – The JMA reports that Tropical Storm Sonamu (Auring), has become a severe tropical storm as it reaches its peak intensity with 10 — minute sustained windspeeds of 95 km/h (60 mph).
- 00:00 UTC – The CMA reports that Tropical Storm Sonamu (Auring), has reached its peak intensity with 2 –minute sustained windspeeds of 75 km/h (45 mph).
- 00:00 UTC – The JTWC reports that Tropical Storm Sonamu (Auring), has reached its peak intensity with 1 –minute sustained windspeeds of 75 km/h (45 mph).

January 6

- 06:00 UTC – The JMA reports that Tropical Storm Sonamu (Auring), has weakened into a tropical storm, as it starts to monitor a tropical depression located about 480 km (300 mi) to the southeast of Melekeok, Palau.

January 7

- 12:00 UTC – The JTWC reports that Tropical Storm Sonamu (Auring), has weakened into a tropical depression.

January 8

- 00:00 UTC – The JMA and CMA report that Tropical Storm Sonamu (Auring), has weakened into a tropical depression.
- 00:00 UTC – The JTWC stops monitoring Tropical Depression Sonamu (Auring).

January 9

- 06:00 UTC – The CMA stops monitoring Tropical Depression Sonamu (Auring), as it weakens below tropical depression strength.

January 10

- 00:00 UTC – The JMA reports that Tropical Depression Sonamu (Auring), has dissipated about 120 km (75 mi) to the northwest of Borneo.

January 11

- 12:00 UTC – PAGASA names the tropical depression, that the JMA were previous monitoring to the southeast of Palau: Bising.

January 13

- 00:00 UTC – PAGASA reports that Tropical Depression Bising has weakened into an area of low pressure and issues its final advisory on it.
- 12:00 UTC – Tropical Depression Bising is last noted by the JMA, while the system is located about 865 km (535 mi) to the southeast of Taipei, Taiwan.

=== February ===
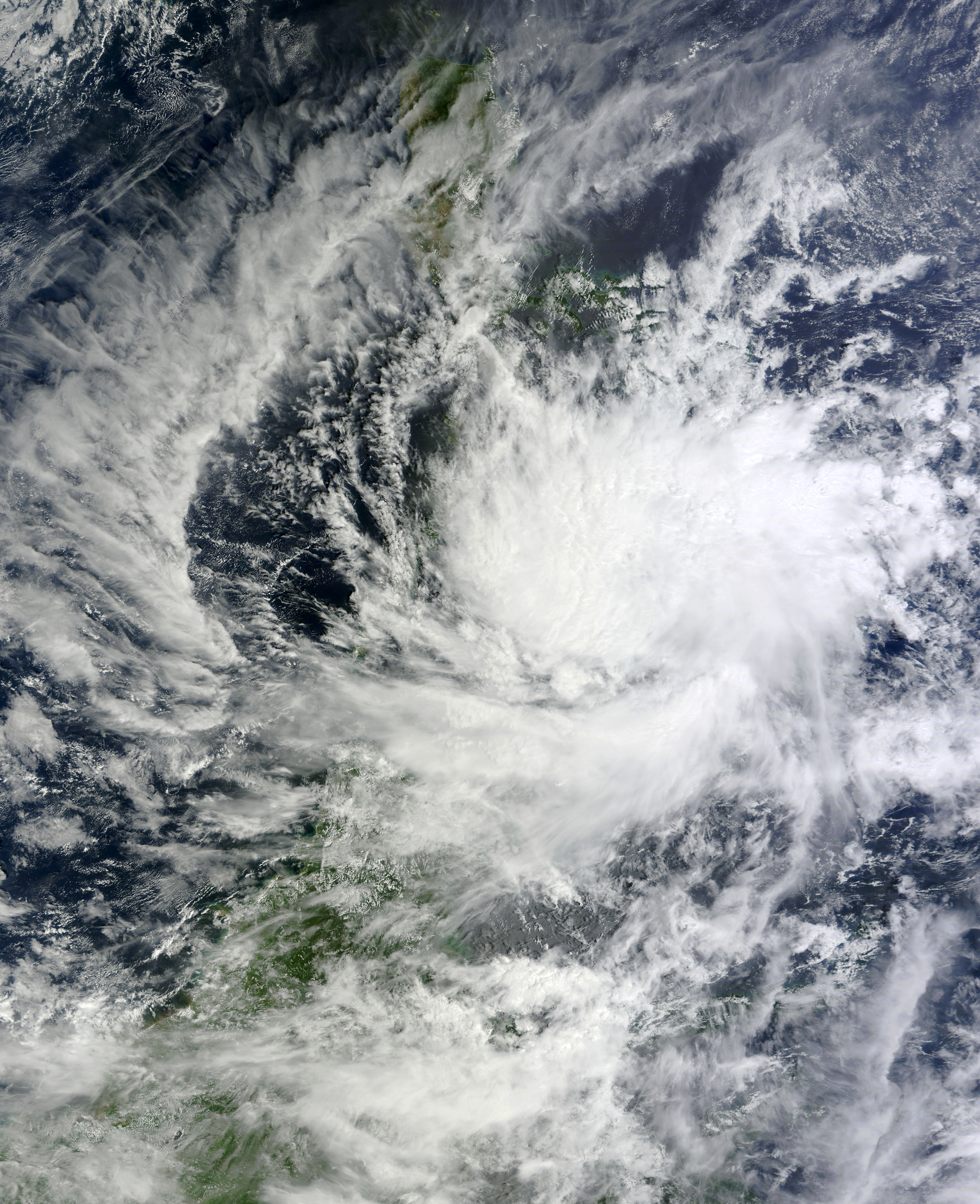
Tropical Depression 02W on February 19, just before being classified as a tropical storm

February 18

- 0600 UTC – The JMA and CMA report that a tropical depression has developed about 650 km (405 mi) to the east of General Santos City on the Philippine island of Mindanao.
- 0930 UTC – PAGASA names the tropical depression: Crising.

February 19

- 0900 UTC – PAGASA reports that Tropical Depression Crising has made landfall, on the southern tip of Davao del Sur province on the Philippine island of Mindanao.
- 2100 UTC – PAGASA reports that Tropical Depression Crising, has moved into the Sulu Sea after passing around Mindanao island.

February 21

- 0900 UTC – The JTWC issues its final advisory on Tropical Depression Crising.
- 0900 UTC – PAGASA reports that Tropical Depression Crising has left its area of responsibility and issues its final advisory.
- 1800 UTC – The JMA reports that Tropical Depression Crising has intensified into a tropical storm, while at its peak intensity with 10-minute sustained wind speeds of 65 km/h (40 mph).
- 1800 UTC – The CMA reports that Tropical Depression Crising has intensified into a tropical storm, while at its peak intensity with 2-minute sustained wind speeds of 65 km/h (40 mph).
- 1800 UTC — The JTWC starts to monitor Tropical Storm Crising as a tropical depression, while at its peak intensity with peak 1-minute sustained wind speeds of 45 km/h (30 mph).

February 22

- 0000 UTC – The JMA names Tropical Storm Crising; Shanshan.
- 1200 UTC – The JMA reports that Tropical Storm Shanshan (Crising), has weakened into a tropical depression.
- 1200 UTC – The JTWC reports that Tropical Depression Shanshan (Crising), has weakened into a tropical disturbance.

February 23

- 0000 UTC – The CMA reports that Tropical Storm Shanshan (Crising) has weakened into a tropical depression.
- 0600 UTC – The JTWC, CMA and JMA stop monitoring Tropical Depression Shanshan (Crising) as it dissipated, about 320 km (200 mi) to the north–west of Kuching in Malaysia.

=== March ===
March 20

- 0600 UTC — The JMA reports that a tropical depression has developed about 1,470 km (915 mi) to the southeast of Manila, Philippines.

March 21

- 1800 UTC — The JMA stops monitoring the tropical depression.

=== May ===
- There were no tropical cyclones recorded within the basin during May.

=== June ===
June 6

- 18:00 UTC – The JMA reports that a tropical depression, has formed about 845 km (525 mi) to the southeast of Manila on the Philippine island of Luzon.

June 7

- 12:00 UTC – The CMA and PAGASA start monitoring the tropical depression, with the latter naming it Dante.

June 8

- 12:00 UTC – The CMA and JMA report that Tropical Depression Dante, has intensified into a tropical storm, with the JMA naming it Yagi.
- 12:00 UTC – The JTWC initiates advisories on Tropical Storm Yagi (Dante) and assigns it the designation 03W.
- 18:00 UTC – The JTWC reports that Tropical Depression Yagi (Dante), has intensified into a tropical storm.

June 10

- 12:00 UTC – The JMA reports that Tropical Storm Yagi (Dante), has peaked with 10-minute sustained wind speeds of 85 km/h (55 mph).
- 12:00 UTC – The CMA reports that Tropical Storm Yagi (Dante), has peaked with 2-minute sustained wind speeds of 95 km/h (60 mph), which made the system a severe tropical storm.
- 12:00 UTC – PAGASA issues its final advisory on Tropical Storm Yagi (Dante), as it moves out of their area of responsibility.

June 11

- 06:00 UTC – The CMA reports that Severe Tropical Storm Yagi (Dante) has weakened into a tropical storm.

June 12

- 06:00 UTC – The JMA reports that Tropical Storm Yagi (Dante), has degenerated into an extratropical low.
- 12:00 UTC – The CMA reports that Tropical Storm Yagi has weakened into a tropical depression.

June 14

- 00:00 UTC – The CMA stops monitoring Tropical Storm Yagi, as it weakens below tropical depression intensity.

June 16

- 06:00 UTC – The JMA reports that a tropical depression has formed, about 840 km (520 mi) to the southeast of Manila in the Philippines.
- 09:00 UTC – PAGASA names the tropical depression; Emong.
- 12:00 UTC – The JMA reports that the extratropical low that was Tropical Storm Yagi, has dissipated about 1,600 km (995 mi) to the southeast of Tokyo, Japan.
- 18:00 UTC – The CMA starts monitoring Tropical Depression Emong.

June 17

- 18:00 UTC – The JTWC initiates advisories on Tropical Depression Emong, and assigns it the designation 04W.

June 18

- 00:00 UTC – The JMA reports that Tropical Depression Emong, has developed into a tropical storm and names it Leepi.
- 18:00 UTC – The JMA reports that Tropical Storm Leepi (Emong), has reached its peak intensity with 10-minute sustained winds of 75 km/h (45 mph).

June 19

- 18:00 UTC – The JMA reports that a tropical depression has developed within the South China Sea, about 445 km (275 mi) to the west of Manila in the Philippines.

- The low pressure area intensified as a tropical depression as the PAGASA named it Fabian. Fabian also gave the designation 05W.

June 20

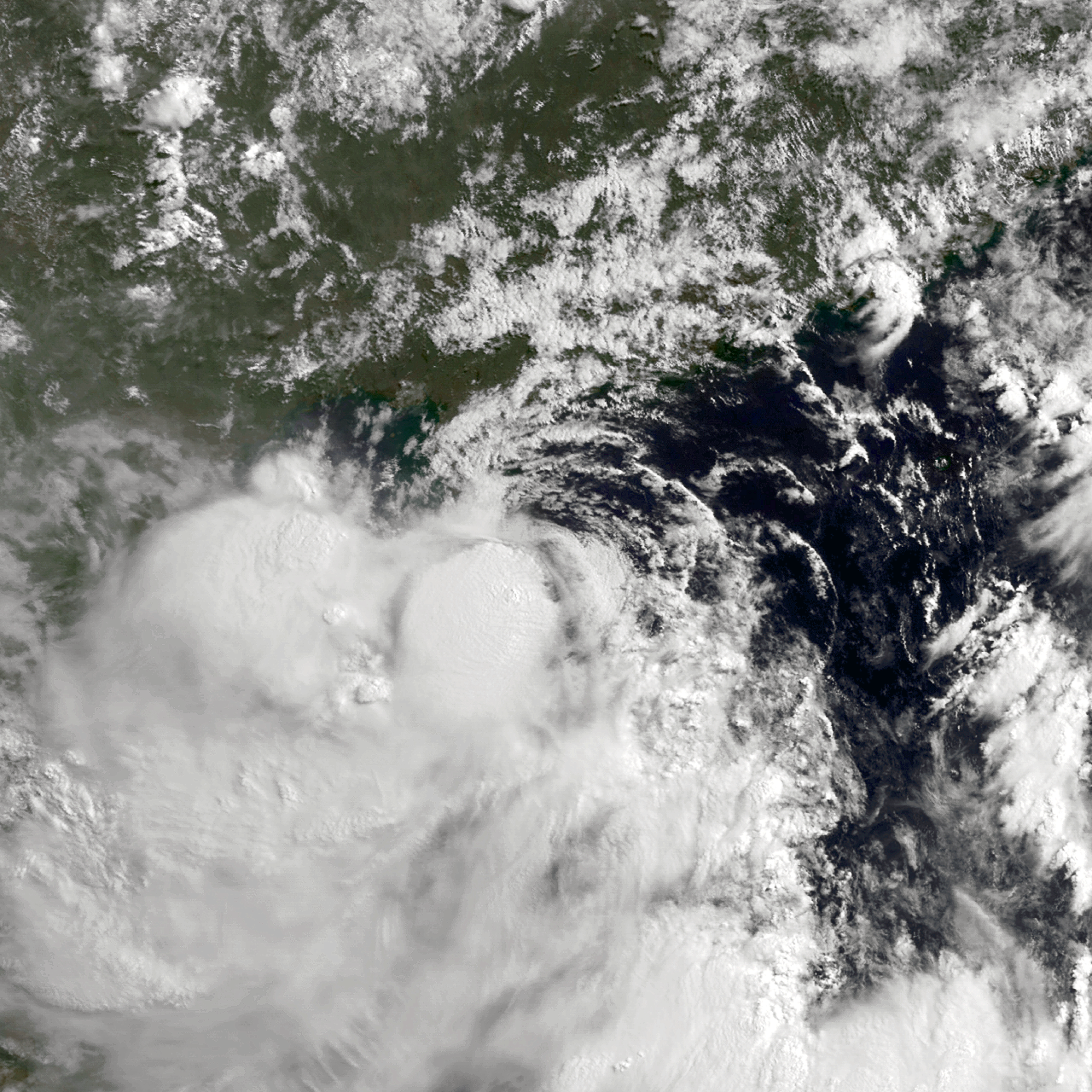
Bebinca at peak intensity on June 22

- 18:00 UTC – The JMA reports that Tropical Depression Fabian, has intensified into a tropical storm and names it Bebinca.

June 21

- 00:00 UTC – The JMA reports that Tropical Storm Leepi, has degenerated into an extratropical low.

June 22

- 00:00 UTC – The JMA reports that Tropical Storm Bebinca (Fabian), has reached its peak intensity, with 10-minute sustained windspeeds of 75 km/h (45 mph).

June 24

- 00:00 UTC – The JMA reports that the extratropical low that was Tropical Storm Leepi, has dissipated over 2,665 km (1,655 mi) to the southeast of Anchorage, Alaska.
- 06:00 UTC – The JMA reports that Tropical Storm Bebinca (Fabian), has weakened into a tropical depression, over the Vietnamese province of Bắc Giang.
- 12:00 UTC – The JMA reports that Tropical Depression Bebinca (Fabian) has dissipated over land, near the border between the Vietnamese provinces of Bắc Giang and Lạng Sơn.

June 27

- 00:00 UTC – The JMA reports that a tropical depression has developed within the South China Sea, about 445 km (275 mi) to the west of Manila.

June 28

- 12:00 UTC – The JMA reports that the tropical depression, has intensified into a tropical storm and names it Rumbia.

=== July ===
July 1

- 06:00 UTC — The JMA reports that Tropical Storm Rumbia has reached its peak intensity, with 10-minute sustained windspeeds of 95 km/h (60 mph) which made it a severe tropical storm.
- 18:00 UTC — The JMA reports that Severe Tropical Storm Rumbia has weakened into a tropical storm.

July 2

- 12:00 UTC — The JMA reports that Tropical Storm Rumbia has weakened into a tropical depression over the Chinese autonomous region of Guangxi.
- 18:00 UTC — The JMA reports that Tropical Depression Rumbia has dissipated over the Chinese autonomous region of Guangxi.

July 6
- A large disturbance forms in the Pacific Ocean.

July 7
- The JMA has upgraded the disturbance to a depression as it moves a west-southwest direction naming it 07W.

July 8
- 07W rapidly wraps itself with dry air and some clusters of thunderstorms becoming a tropical storm naming it Soulik.
- Soulik rapidly becomes a severe tropical storm creating an unbalanced eye.

July 9
- Soulik rapidly becomes a Category 2 typhoon then a Category 3 typhoon in early noon making the unbalanced eye to a balanced eye.
July 10
- Soulik gathers some more warm water and evaporation as it becomes a Category 4 typhoon and enters the Philippine are of responsibility naming it Huaning.
July 11
- Soulik's eye becomes unbalanced again as it weakens to a Category 2 typhoon as it enters Taiwan on late July 11.
July 14
- Soulik gradually weakens over land and dissipated.
July 15
- A broad of low pressure area is located in the eastern Philippines naming it Isang.
July 16
- Isang rapidly makes and strikes thunderstorms as it becomes Tropical Storm Cimaron still on sea.
July 17
- Cimaron grew smaller as it didn't intensify more as it gers towards southern Taiwan.
July 18
- Cimaron dissipates as it gets towards the coast. Its remnants stayed there and moved north towards land and dissipated early on July 20 killing 2.

July 28

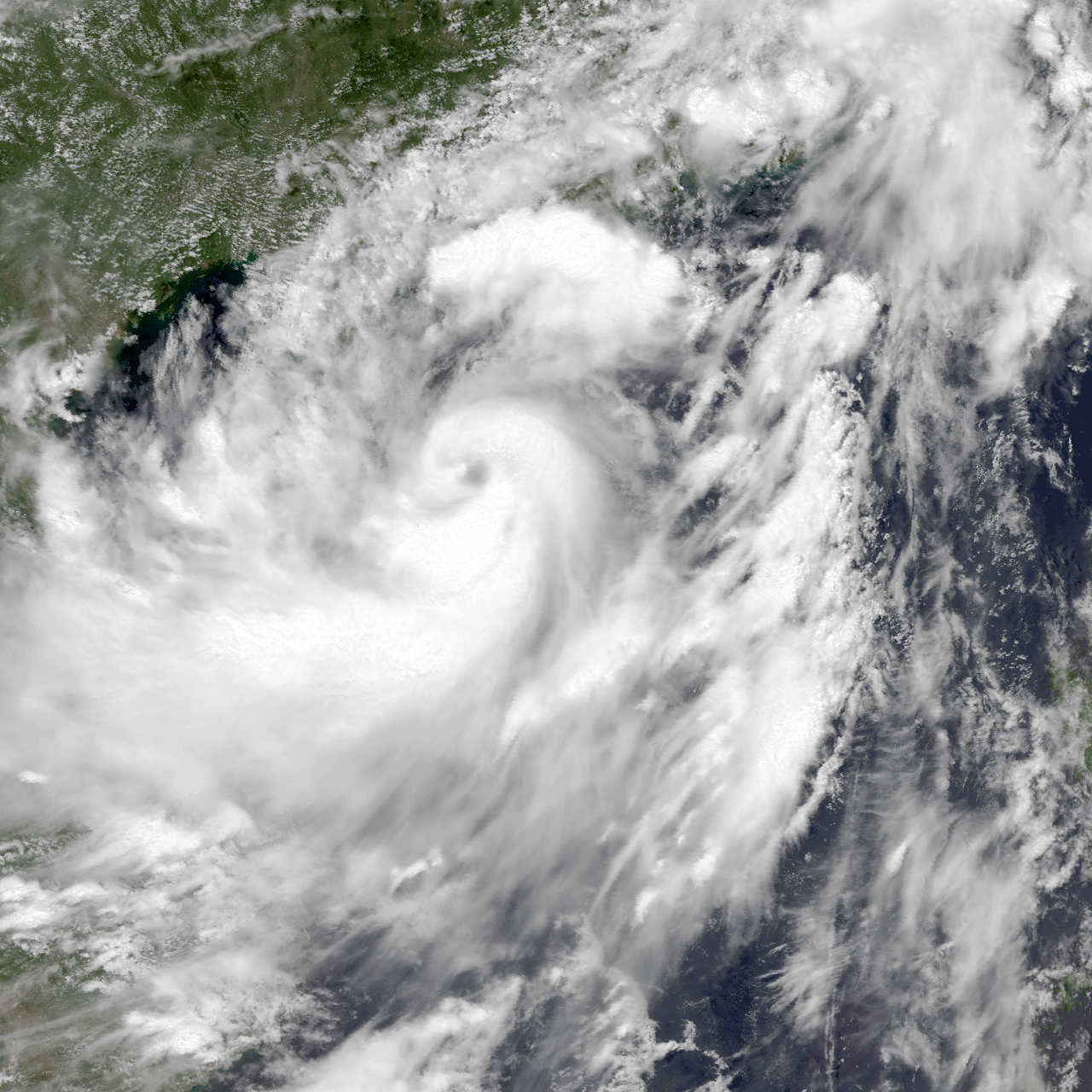
Tropical Storm Jebi at peak intensity

- 1800 UTC — The JMA reports that a tropical depression has formed, about 60 km (35 mi) to the south of Naga City on Luzon in the Philippines.

July 31

- 0000 UTC — The JMA reports that the tropical depression, has developed into a tropical storm and names it Jebi.

- The tropical depression was named Jolina by the PAGASA as it crossed the Philippines.

=== August ===
August 2

- 0600 UTC — The JMA reports that Tropical Storm Jebi, has reached its peak intensity of 95 km/h (60 mph), which makes it a severe tropical storm.

August 3

- 0600 UTC — The JMA reports that Severe Tropical Storm Jebi, has weakened into a tropical storm.
- 1200 UTC — The JMA reports that Tropical Storm Jebi, has weakened into a tropical depression.
- 1800 UTC — The JMA reports that Tropical Depression Jebi, has dissipated over northern Vietnam.

August 5

- 0000 UTC — The JMA reports that a tropical depression has formed, about 145 km (90 mi) to the northeast of Puerto Princesa in Palawan.
- 0600 UTC — PAGASA names the tropical depression; Kiko.

August 6

- 1200 UTC — The JMA reports that Tropical Depression Kiko has developed into a tropical storm and names it Mangkhut.

- Kiko was upgraded to 10W by the JTWC

August 7

- 0000 UTC — The JMA reports that Tropical Storm Mangkhut, has reached its peak intensity with 10 – minute sustained windspeeds of 75 km/h (45 mph).

August 8

- 0000 UTC — The JMA reports that Tropical Storm Mangkhut, has weakened into a tropical depression over Houaphan Province in Laos.
- 0600 UTC — The JMA reports that Tropical Depression Mangkhut, has dissipated over Houaphan Province in Laos.
- 1200 UTC – The JMA reports that a tropical depression has developed about 560 km (350 mi) to the north of Palau.
- 2100 UTC – PAGASA names the tropical depression; Labuyo.
- 2100 UTC – The JTWC initiates advisories on Tropical Depression Labuyo, and designates it as Tropical Depression 11W.

August 9

- 0600 UTC – The JMA reports that Tropical Depression Labuyo, has intensified into a tropical storm and names it Utor.

August 10

- 1800 UTC – The JMA reports that Tropical Storm Utor (Labuyo), has intensified into a typhoon.

- Utor slowly moved northwest as it began explosive intensification as a Tropical Storm to a Category 4 super typhoon headed towards the northern part of the Philippines.

August 11
- The SSHS and the JTWC upgraded Utor to a super typhoon. Utor is the first super typhoon in the 2013 season.

August 12
- Utor maintained its strength as it moves towards the northern part of the Philippines.
- On late August 12, Utor weaken to a Category 2 typhoon as it is in the middle part of Luzon, Philippines.

August 13
- Early on August 13, Utor once more absorb warm waters in the south China sea.
One of Utor's outflow turned into a disturbance. Typhoon Utor slammed Guangdong the next day.

August 14

- 1200 UTC – The JMA reports that Typhoon Utor (Labuyo) has weakened into a severe tropical storm.
- 1800 UTC – The JMA reports that Severe Tropical Storm Utor (Labuyo) has weakened into a tropical storm.

August 15

- 1200 UTC – The JMA reports that Tropical Storm Utor (Labuyo) has weakened into a tropical depression.

- The disturbance from the outflow from Utor, becomes a tropical depression.

August 16
- A new depression is located northeast of the other depression and gave the designations 12W and 13W. Later that day, the PAGASA named it Maring.

- 1200 UTC – The JMA reports that a tropical depression has developed, about 340 km (210 mi) to the southeast of Taipei, Taiwan.

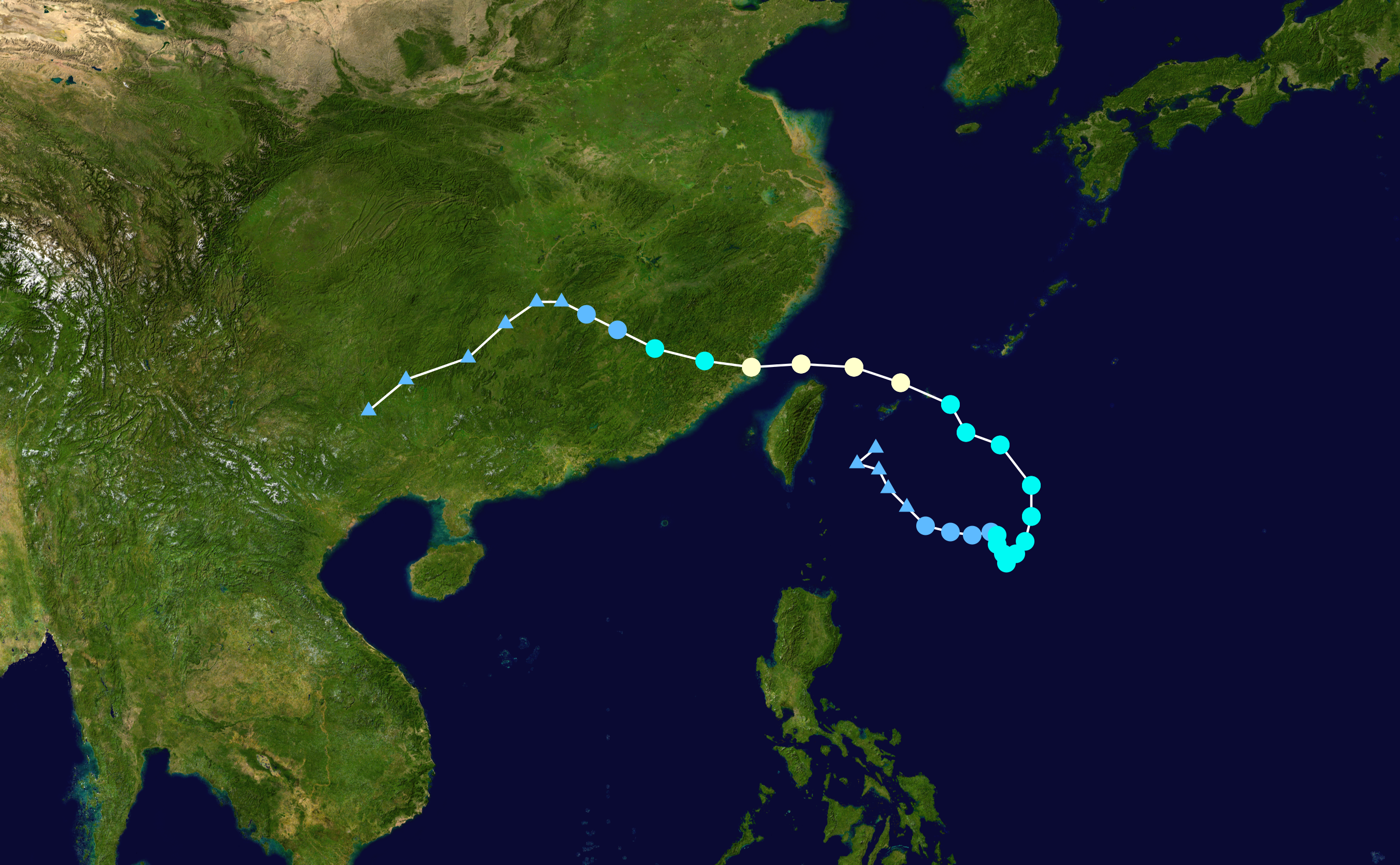
Track of Trami during mid–August

August 17
- Maring intensify to Tropical Storm Trami as it made a Fujiwhara effect with 13W northeast of it.

August 18

- 0000 UTC – The JMA reports that Tropical Depression 12W has intensified into a tropical storm and names it Trami.
- 1200 UTC – The JMA reports that Tropical Storm Pewa has moved into the Western Pacific basin from the Central Pacific.
- 1800 UTC – The JMA reports that Tropical Depression Utor has dissipated.

August 19

- 0000 UTC – The JMA reports that Tropical Storm Pewa has intensified into a severe tropical storm, as it reaches it 10-minute peak sustained windspeeds of 100 km/h (60 mph).
- 0600 UTC – The JMA reports that Tropical Storm Unala has moved into the Western Pacific basin from the Central Pacific.
- 1200 UTC – The JMA reports that Tropical Storm Unala has weakened into a tropical depression.
- 1200 UTC – The JTWC issues its first and only warning on Tropical Depression Unala.
- 1800 UTC – The JMA reports that Tropical Storm Trami has intensified into a severe tropical storm.
- 1800 UTC – The JMA reports that Severe Tropical Storm Pewa has weakened into a tropical storm.
- 1800 UTC – The JMA reports that Tropical Depression Unala has dissipated.

August 20
- The JTWC upgraded Trami to a typhoon.

- 1800 UTC – The JMA issues its first and only warning on Tropical Depression 03C as it moved westwards into the Western Pacific from the Central Pacific and the periphery of Severe Tropical Storm Pewa.
- 2100 UTC – The JTWC issues its first and only warning on Tropical Depression 03C.

August 21

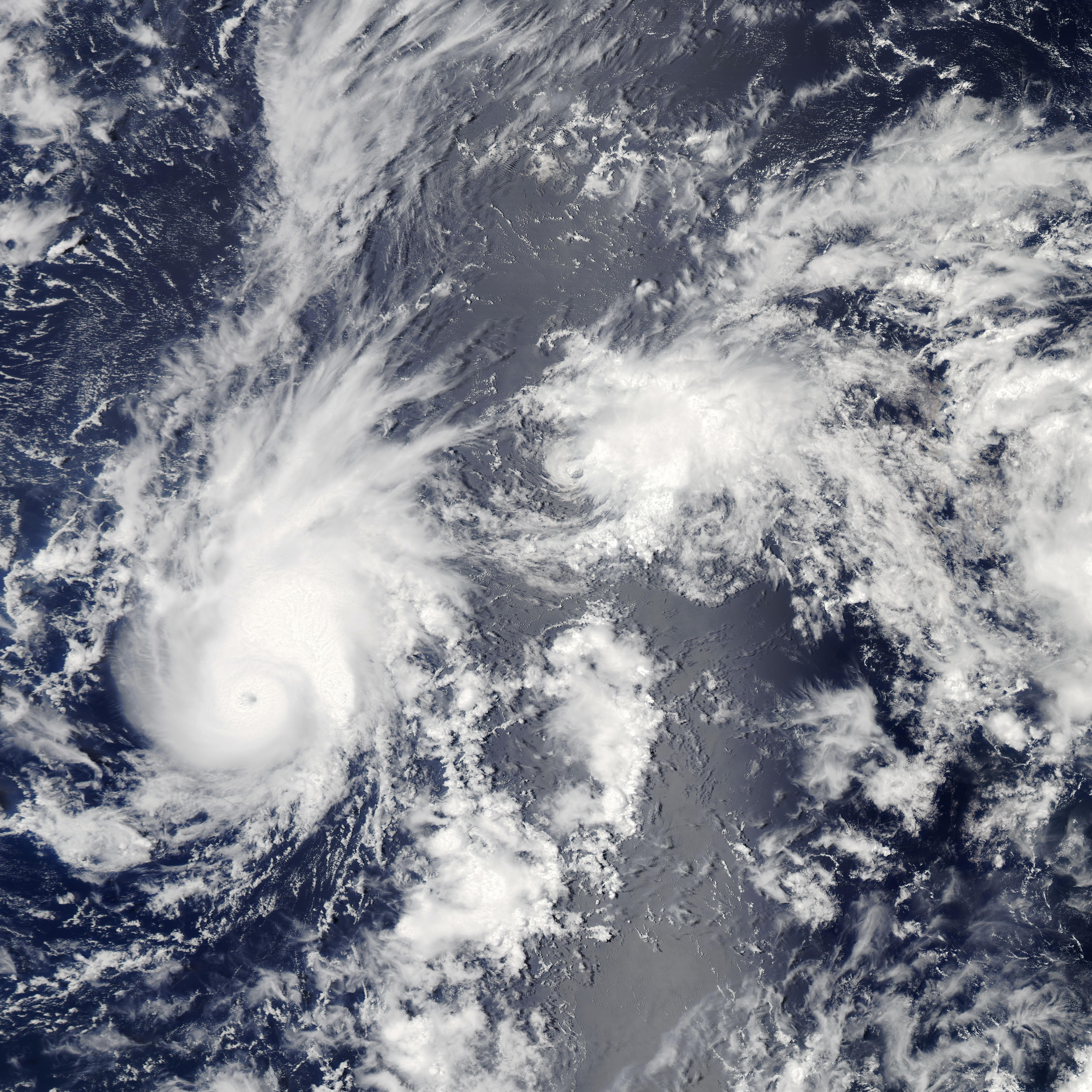
Tropical Storms Pewa (bottom) and Unala (top–right) near the 180th meridian

August 22

- 0600 UTC – The JMA reports that Severe Tropical Storm Trami has weakened into a tropical storm, while located over the Chinese province of Fujian.
- 1800 UTC – The JMA reports that Tropical Storm Trami has weakened into a tropical depression, while located over the Chinese province of Jiangxi.

August 23

August 24

- 0600 UTC – The JMA reports that Tropical Depression Trami has dissipated, while located over the Chinese autonomous region of Guangxi.

August 25

- 0000 UTC – The JMA reports that Tropical Storm Pewa has weakened into a tropical depression.
- 0000 UTC – The JMA reports that a tropical depression has developed, about 940 km (585 mi) to the southeast of Manila on the Philippine island of Luzon.

- The disturbance in the Philippines was upgraded to Tropical Depression Nando.

August 26

- 0600 UTC – The JMA reports that Tropical Depression Nando has intensified into a tropical storm and names it Kong–rey.

August 27

- 0000 UTC – The JMA reports that Tropical Depression Pewa has dissipated over 2,300 km (1,430 mi) to the east of Tokyo, Japan.

- An area of deep convection was located near the Wake Islands.

August 28

- 0000 UTC – The JMA reports that Tropical Storm Kong–rey, has intensified into a severe tropical storm.
- 1200 UTC – The JMA reports that Severe Tropical Storm Kong–rey has reached its peak intensity, with 10-minute sustained windspeeds of 55 knots.

August 29

- 0000 UTC – The JMA reports that a tropical depression has developed about 1,145 km (710 mi) to the northeast of Wake Island.
- 0000 UTC – The JMA reports that Severe Tropical Storm Kong–rey, has weakened into a tropical storm.

August 30

- 0000 UTC – The JMA reports that Tropical Storm Kong–rey has weakened into a tropical depression.
- 1200 UTC – The JMA reports that Tropical Depression Kong–rey has dissipated over water about 610 km (380 mi) to the northeast of Taipei, Taiwan.

August 31

- 0600 UTC – The JMA reports that a tropical depression has developed about 60 km (35 mi) to the north of Taipei, Taiwan.

=== September ===
September 1

- 0000 UTC – The JMA reports that the tropical depression that was located to the northeast of Wake Island has developed into a tropical storm and names it Yutu.
- 1500 UTC – The JTWC initiates advisories on the tropical depression, that was previously located to the north of Japan and designates it as Tropical Depression 15W.
- 1800 UTC – The JMA reports that Tropical Storm Yutu, has weakened into a tropical depression.
- 1800 UTC – The JMA reports that Tropical Depression 15W has intensified into a tropical storm and names it Toraji.

September 3

- 0000 UTC – The JMA reports that Tropical Storm Toraji has intensified into a severe tropical storm, as it reaches its 10-minute peak sustained windspeeds of 95 km/h (60 mph).
- 1800 UTC – The JMA reports that Severe Tropical Storm Toraji has made landfall, near Ibusuki City in Kagoshima Prefecture, Japan.

September 4

- 0000 UTC – The JMA reports that Severe Tropical Storm Toraji has degenerated into an extratropical low, while located over the south–western part of Shikoku Island.

September 5

- 1200 UTC – The JMA reports that the extratropical low, that was Severe Tropical Storm Toraji has dissipated.
- 1800 UTC – The JMA reports that Tropical Storm Yutu has dissipated.

September 11

- 1800 UTC – The JMA reports that a tropical depression has developed about 565 km (350 mi) to the northeast of Saipan, in the Northern Mariana Islands.

September 12

- 1800 UTC – The JMA names the tropical depression: Man–yi.
- 2100 UTC – The JTWC designates Man–yi as Tropical Depression 16W.

September 13

- 0000 UTC – The JMA reports that Tropical Depression Man–yi, has intensified into a tropical storm.
- 0600 UTC – The JTWC reports that Tropical Depression Man–yi, has intensified into a tropical storm.

September 14

- 0600 UTC – The JMA reports that Tropical Storm Man–yi has intensified into a severe tropical storm.

September 15

- 1200 UTC – The JMA reports that Severe Tropical Storm Man–yi has intensified into a typhoon, as it reaches it peaks with 10-minute sustained windspeeds of 120 km/h (75 mph).
- 1200 UTC – The JTWC reports that Tropical Storm 16W (Man–yi), has peaked with 1-minute sustained windspeeds of 110 km/h (70 mph).
- 2300 UTC – The JMA reports that Typhoon Man–yi has made landfall on the Japanese island of Honshu, near Toyohashi City in Aichi Prefecture.

September 16

- 0000 UTC – The JMA reports that Typhoon Man–yi has weakened into a severe tropical storm, while located over the Japanese island of Honshu.
- 0000 UTC – The JMA reports that a tropical depression has developed, about 1,220 km (760 mi) to the northeast of Manila on the Philippine island of Luzon.
- 0600 UTC – The JTWC issues its final advisory on Tropical Storm Man–yi, as the system rapidly weakens and transitions into an extratropical low.
- 0900 UTC – PAGASA names the tropical depression; Odette.
- 1200 UTC – The JMA reports that Severe Tropical Storm Man–yi has degenerated into an extratropical low.
- 1800 UTC – The JMA reports that the tropical depression has intensified into a tropical storm and names it Usagi.
- 2100 UTC – The JTWC initiates advisories on Tropical Storm Usagi and designates it as Tropical Depression 17W.

September 17

September 18

- 0000 UTC – The JMA reports that Tropical Storm Usagi, has intensified into a severe tropical storm.
- 1200 UTC – The JMA reports that Severe Tropical Storm Usagi, has intensified into a typhoon.

- Tropical Depression was then upgraded to 18W located east of Vietnam with an exposed circulation at first.

September 19

- 0600 UTC – The JMA reports that a tropical depression has formed, about 325 km (200 mi) to the southeast of the Northern Mariana Island, Saipan.
- 1800 UTC – The JMA reports that Typhoon Usagi, has reached its peak intensity, with 10-minute sustained windspeeds of 205 km/h (125 mph).

- Severe Tropical Storm Usagi underwent an explosive intensification. It became a Category 4 super typhoon later that day.
- 18W dissipates slowly as it moves westwards.

September 20

- 1800 UTC – The JMA reports that the extratropical low that was Typhoon Man–yi, has dissipated to the east of the Russian Kamchatka Peninsula.

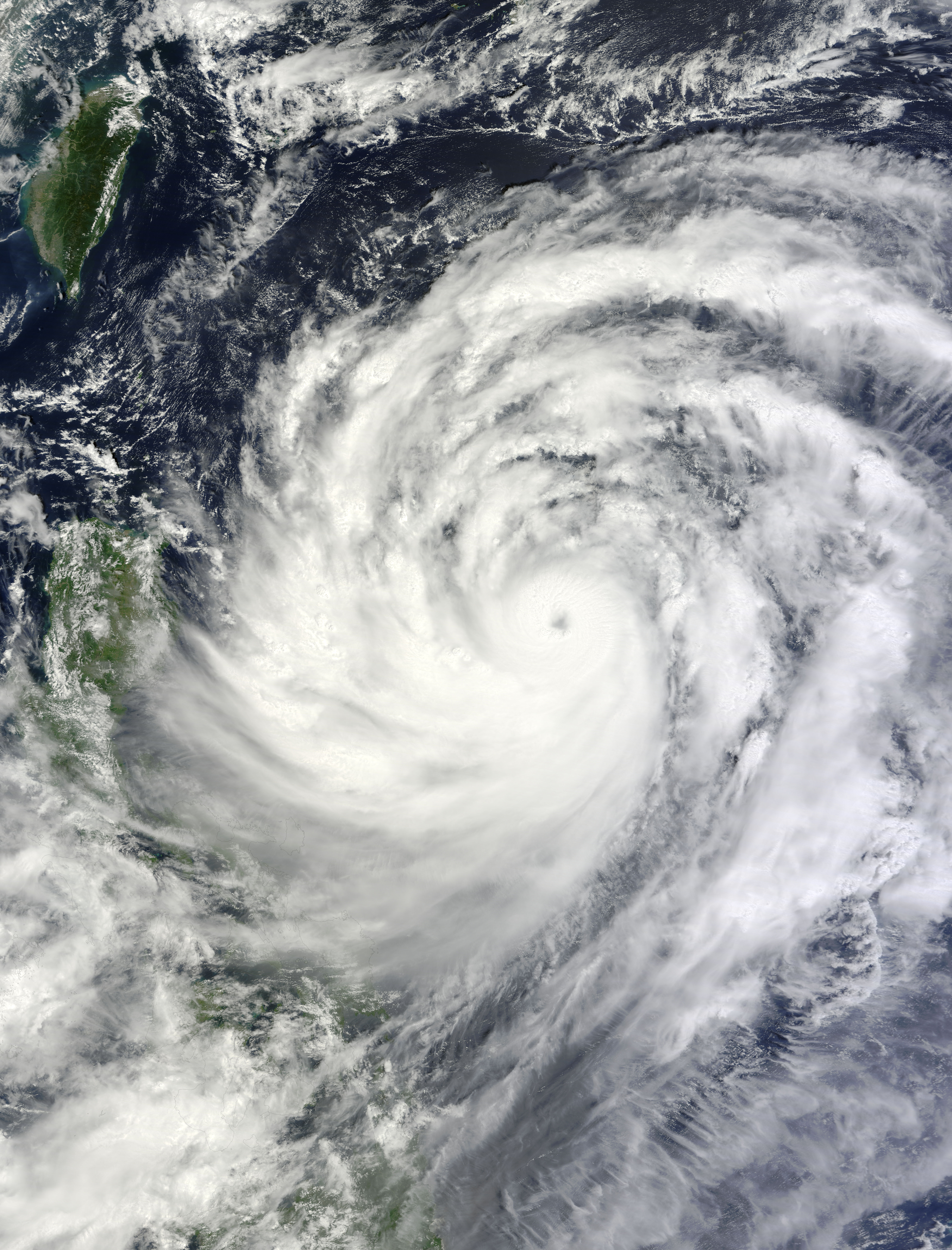
Typhoon Usagi at its peak intensity as a Category 4 super typhoon

September 21
- Super typhoon Usagi slowly weakens but is still a typhoon.
- The tropical depression was designated 19W by the JTWC on September 21.

September 22

- 0600 UTC – The JMA reports that Tropical Storm Pabuk, has intensified into a severe tropical storm.
- 1800 UTC – The JMA reports that Typhoon Usagi, has weakened into a severe tropical storm.

September 23

- 0000 UTC – The JMA reports that Severe Tropical Storm Usagi has weakened into a tropical storm.
- 0600 UTC – The JMA reports that Tropical Storm Usagi has weakened into a tropical depression.

September 24

- 0600 UTC – The JMA reports that Tropical Depression Usagi has dissipated over the Chinese autonomous region of Guangxi.
- 1200 UTC – The JMA reports that Severe Tropical Storm Pabuk has reached its peak intensity with 10-minute sustained windspeeds of 110 km/h (70 mph).

September 25
- The JTWC upgrades Pabuk to a Category 2 typhoon.

- 1800 UTC — The JMA reports that a tropical depression has developed, about 275 km (170 mi) to the east of Manila on the Philippine island of Luzon.

September 26

- 0900 UTC — PAGASA names the depression, Paolo.
- 2100 UTC — The JTWC initiates advisories on Tropical Depression Paolo and designates it as Tropical Depression 20W.

September 27

- 0000 UTC – The JMA reports that Severe Tropical Storm Pabuk, has degenerated into an extratropical low.
- 0600 UTC — The JMA reports that Tropical Depression Paolo has intensified into a tropical storm and names it Wutip.
- 0600 UTC — The JTWC reports that Tropical Depression Paolo has intensified into a tropical storm.

September 28

- 0000 UTC – The JMA reports Tropical Storm Wutip has intensified into a severe tropical storm.
- 1200 UTC — The JMA reports that Severe Tropical Storm Wutip has reached its peak intensity of 130 km/h (80 mph), as it intensifies into a typhoon.

September 29

- 0000 UTC – The JMA stops monitoring the extratropical low that was Severe Tropical Storm Pabuk, as the system moves into the Eastern Pacific Ocean.
- 0600 UTC — The JMA reports that a tropical depression has developed, about 1,500 km (930 mi) to the southeast of Tokyo, Japan.
- 0600 UTC — The JMA reports that a tropical depression has developed, about 320 km (200 mi) to the north of Koror, Palau.
- 0600 UTC — PAGASA names the tropical depression, located to the north of Koror, Palau; Quedan.

September 30

- 0000 UTC — The JMA reports that the tropical depression has developed into a tropical storm and names it Sepat.
- 0300 UTC — The JTWC initiates advisories on Tropical Storm Sepat and designates it as Tropical Depression 21W.
- 1200 UTC — The JMA reports that Typhoon Wutip has weakened into a severe tropical storm, while located over the Vietnamese province of Quảng Bình.
- 1200 UTC — The JMA reports that Tropical Storm Sepat has reached its peak intensity, with 10-minute sustained windspeeds of 75 km/h (45 mph).
- 1200 UTC — The JMA names Tropical Depression Quedan: Fitow.
- 1800 UTC — The JMA reports that Severe Tropical Storm Wutip has weakened into a tropical storm, while located over the Thai province of Bueng Kan.
- 1800 UTC — The JMA reports that Tropical Depression Fitow, has intensified into a tropical storm.

- The JTWC follows and tracks Quedan designating it 22W.

=== October ===
October 1

- 0000 UTC — The JMA reports that a tropical depression has developed, about 900 km (560 mi) to the northeast of Hagåtña, Guam.
- 0000 UTC — The JMA reports that Tropical Storm Wutip has weakened into a tropical depression, while located over the Lao province of Vientiane.
- 0600 UTC — The JMA reports that Tropical Storm Wutip has dissipated, while located over the Lao province of Vientiane.
- 0600 UTC — The JTWC reports that Tropical Depression 21W has reached tropical storm intensity, naming it Sepat, with 1-minute sustained windspeeds of 70 km/h (40 mph) as it becomes a tropical storm.

October 2

- 0000 UTC — The JMA reports that Tropical Storm Fitow, has intensified into a severe tropical storm.
- 0300 UTC – The JTWC issues its final advisory on Tropical Storm Sepat, as it transitions into an extratropical low.
- 1800 UTC — The JMA reports that Tropical Storm Sepat, has degenerated into an extratropical low.

October 3
- The depression was numbered as 23W as it heads towards warm waters and convection.

- 1800 UTC — The JMA reports that the extratropical low that was Tropical Storm Sepat, has dissipated near the Russian Kamchatka Peninsula.

October 4

- 1200 UTC — The JMA reports that Severe Tropical Storm Fitow, has developed into a typhoon.
- 1800 UTC — The JMA reports that Typhoon Fitow has reached its peak intensity, with 10-minute sustained windspeeds of 140 km/h (85 mph).

- Fitow becomes a Category 2 typhoon as it impacts the southern Japanese islands.
- Tropical Depression 23W slowly intensify to Tropical Storm Danas.

October 5

- 1200 UTC — The JMA reports that Tropical Storm Danas has intensified into a severe tropical storm.

October 6

- 0000 UTC — The JMA reports that Severe Tropical Storm Danas has intensified into a typhoon.
- 1800 UTC — The JMA reports that Typhoon Fitow, has weakened into a severe tropical storm.

- Typhoon Danas enters the Philippine Area of Responsibility and given the name Ramil as it becomes a Category 3 typhoon.

October 7

- 0000 UTC — The JMA reports that Typhoon Danas has reached its peak intensity, with 10-minute sustained windspeeds of 165 km/h (105 mph).
- 0000 UTC — The JMA reports that Severe Tropical Storm Fitow, has weakened into a tropical storm.
- 0600 UTC — The JMA reports that Tropical Storm Fitow, has weakened into a tropical depression.
- 1200 UTC — The JMA reports that Tropical Depression Fitow, has dissipated over the Chinese province of Fujian.

- Typhoon Danas becomes a Category 4 typhoon in a fast pace movement towards the Okinawa Island.
- A tropical depression which formed on October 4, crossed the 100th meridian and became Deep Depression BOB 04.

October 8

- 1200 UTC — The JMA reports that Typhoon Danas has weakened into a severe tropical storm.
- 1200 UTC — The JMA reports that a tropical depression has developed about 1,150 km (715 mi) to the southeast of Manila on the Philippine island of Luzon.
- 1500 UTC — PAGASA names the tropical depression; Santi.
- 1800 UTC — The JMA reports that Severe Tropical Storm Danas has weakened into a tropical storm.
- 2100 UTC — The JTWC initiates advisories on Tropical Depression Santi and designates it as Tropical Depression 24W.

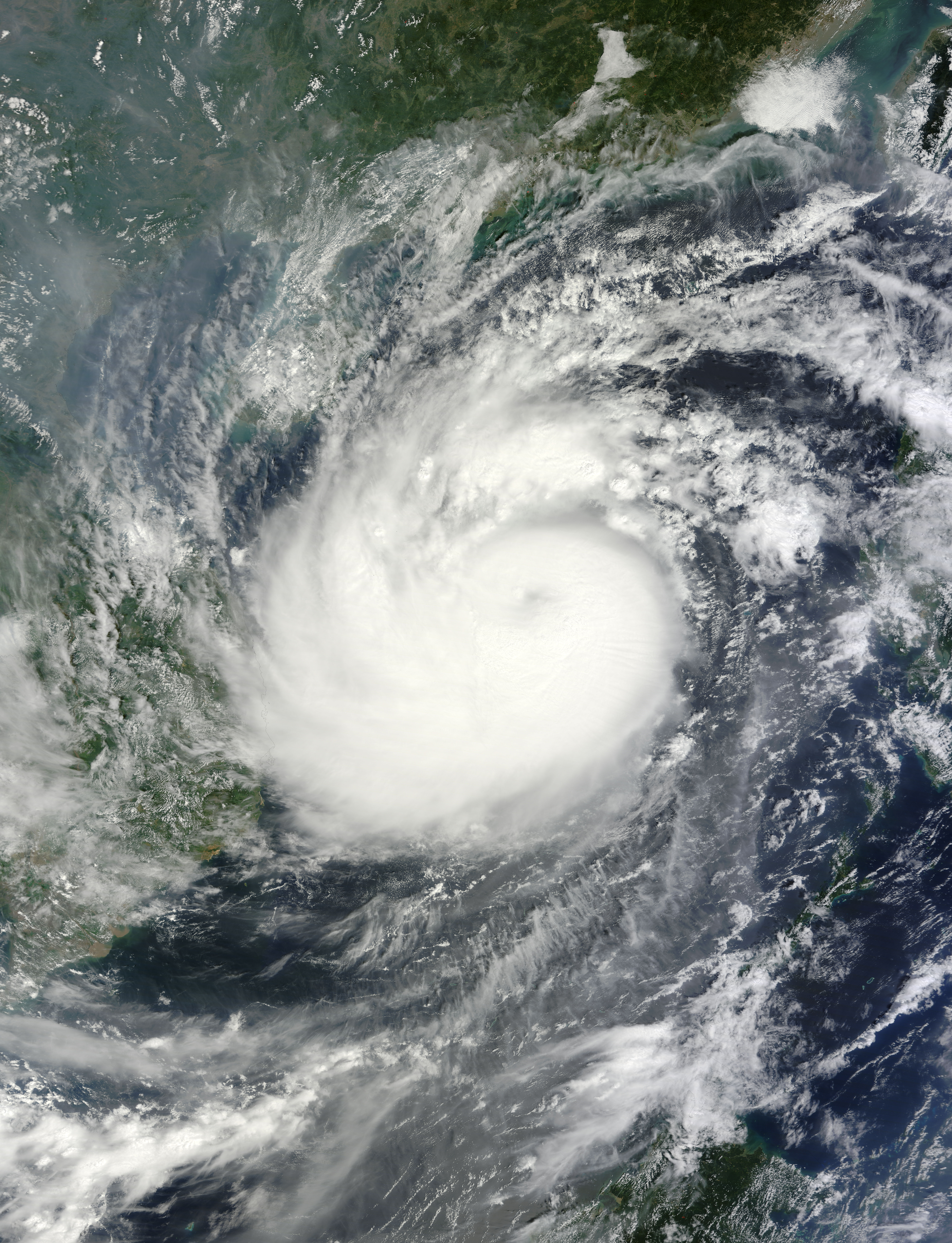
Typhoon Nari approaching Vietnam on October 13

October 9

- 0000 UTC — The JMA reports that a tropical depression has developed, about 460 km (285 mi) to the northeast of Hagåtña, Guam.
- 0000 UTC — The JMA reports that Tropical Storm Danas has degenerated into an extratropical cyclone.
- 1200 UTC — The JMA reports that Tropical Depression Santi, has intensified into a tropical storm and names it Nari.
- 1200 UTC — The JTWC reports that Tropical Storm Nari, has intensified into a tropical storm.
- 1200 UTC — The JMA reports that the extratropical low that was Typhoon Danas, has dissipated.

October 10

- 0600 UTC — The JMA reports that Tropical Storm Nari, has intensified into a severe tropical storm.
- 0600 UTC — The JTWC reports that Tropical Storm Nari has intensified into a typhoon, and become equivalent to a Category 1 hurricane on the SSHWS.
- 1200 UTC — The JMA reports that the tropical depression, previously located to the southeast of Hagåtña, Guam has intensified into a tropical storm, naming it Wipha.
- 1500 UTC — The JTWC initiates advisories on the tropical storm and designates it as Tropical Depression 25W.
- 1800 UTC — The JMA reports that Severe Tropical Storm Nari (Santi), has intensified into a typhoon.
- 1800 UTC — The JMA names Tropical Storm Wipha.
- 1800 UTC — The JTWC reports that Typhoon Nari (Santi), has become equivalent to a Category 2 hurricane on the SSHWS.

October 11

- 0000 UTC — The JTWC reports that Typhoon Nari, has become equivalent to a Category 3 hurricane on the SSHWS.
- 0000 UTC — The JTWC reports that Tropical Depression Wipha, has developed into a tropical storm.
- 0600 UTC — The JTWC reports that Typhoon Nari has reached its peak intensity while equivalent to a Category 3 hurricane on the SSHWS with 1-minute sustained windspeeds of 195 km/h (120 mph).
- 1200 UTC — The JMA reports that Tropical Storm Wipha, has developed into a severe tropical storm.
- 1800 UTC — The JTWC reports that Typhoon Nari has weakened and become equivalent to a Category 2 hurricane on the SSHWS.

October 12

- 0600 UTC — The JTWC reports that Typhoon Nari has weakened and become equivalent to a Category 1 hurricane on the SSHWS.
- 1200 UTC — The JMA reports that Severe Tropical Storm Wipha, has intensified into a typhoon.
- 1200 UTC — The JTWC reports that Tropical Storm Wipha, has intensified into a typhoon and become equivalent to a Category 1 hurricane on the SSHWS.
- 1200 UTC — The JTWC reports that Typhoon Nari, has become equivalent to a Category 2 hurricane on the SSHWS.
- 1800 UTC — The JMA reports that Typhoon Nari has reached its peak intensity, with 10-minute sustained windspeeds of 140 km/h (85 mph).

October 13

- 0000 UTC — The JTWC reports that Typhoon Wipha, has become equivalent to a Category 2 hurricane on the SSHWS.
- 0600 UTC — The JTWC reports that Typhoon Wipha, has become equivalent to a Category 3 hurricane on the SSHWS.
- 1200 UTC — The JTWC reports that Typhoon Wipha, has reached its peak intensity with 1-minute sustained windspeeds of 215 km/h (130 mph), which makes it equivalent to a Category 4 hurricane on the SSHWS.

October 14

- 0000 UTC — The JMA reports that Typhoon Wipha has reached its peak intensity with 10-minute sustained windspeeds of 165 km/h (105 mph).
- 0000 UTC — The JTWC reports that Typhoon Wipha has weakened and become equivalent to a Category 3 hurricane on the SSHWS.
- 0300 UTC — PAGASA reports that Typhoon Wipha has entered, the Philippine area of responsibility and names it Tino.
- 0600 UTC — The JTWC reports that Typhoon Nari (Santi) has weakened and become equivalent to a Category 1 hurricane on the SSHWS.
- 1200 UTC — The JTWC reports that Typhoon Wipha, has weakened and become equivalent to a Category 2 hurricane on the SSHWS.
- 2100 UTC — PAGASA issues its final advisory on Typhoon Wipha (Tino), as it moves out of the Philippine area of responsibility.

October 15

- 0000 UTC — The JMA reports that Typhoon Nari has weakened into a severe tropical storm, while located over Vietnam's Quảng Nam province.
- 0600 UTC — The JTWC reports that Typhoon Wipha, has weakened and become equivalent to a Category 1 hurricane on the SSHWS.
- 1200 UTC — The JMA reports that a tropical depression has developed about 450 km (280 mi) to the northeast of Hagåtña, Guam.
- 0600 UTC — The JMA reports that Severe Tropical Storm Nari has weakened into a tropical storm, while located over Vietnam's Quảng Nam province.
- 1800 UTC — The JMA reports that Tropical Storm Nari has weakened into a tropical depression, while located over Thailand's Ubon Ratchathani Province.
- 2100 UTC — The JTWC issues its final advisory on Typhoon Wipha (Tino), as it transitioned into an extratropical cyclone.
- 2100 UTC — The JTWC initiates advisories on the tropical depression, and designates it as Tropical Depression 26W.

October 16

- 0600 UTC — The JMA reports that Typhoon Wipha, has degenerated into an extratropical low.
- 0600 UTC — The JMA reports that Tropical Depression 26W, has developed into a tropical storm.
- 1200 UTC — The JMA names Tropical Storm 26W; Francisco.
- 1500 UTC — The JTWC reports that Tropical Storm 26W (Francisco), has intensified into a tropical storm.
- 1800 UTC — The JMA reports that Tropical Storm Francisco, has intensified into a severe tropical storm.
- 1800 UTC — The JMA reports that Tropical Depression Nari, has dissipated over Thailand's Khon Kaen Province.

October 17

- 0000 UTC — The JTWC reports that Tropical Storm Francisco, has intensified into a typhoon and become equivalent to a Category 1 hurricane on the SSHWS.
- 0000 UTC — The JMA reports that a tropical depression has developed, about 900 km (560 mi) to the northeast of Hagåtña, Guam.
- 0600 UTC — The JMA reports that Severe Tropical Storm Francisco, has intensified into a typhoon.
- 1200 UTC — The JTWC reports that Typhoon Francisco has become equivalent to a Category 2 hurricane on the SSHWS.
- 1800 UTC — The JTWC reports that Typhoon Francisco has become equivalent to a Category 3 hurricane on the SSHWS.

October 18

- 0000 UTC — The JTWC reports that Typhoon Francisco has become equivalent to a Category 4 hurricane on the SSHWS.
- 1200 UTC – The JMA stops monitoring the extratropical low that was Typhoon Wipha, as the system moves into the Eastern Pacific Ocean.
- 1800 UTC — The JTWC reports that Typhoon Francisco has become a super typhoon while equivalent to a Category 4 hurricane on the SSHWS.
- 1800 UTC — The JMA reports that Typhoon Francisco has peaked with 10-minute sustained windspeeds of 195 km/h (120 mph).

October 19

- 0000 UTC — The JMA reports that a tropical depression has developed about 530 km (330 mi), to the northeast of the Micronesian island of Pohnpei.
- 0600 UTC — The CMA starts monitoring the Tropical Depression.
- 0600 UTC — The JTWC reports that Super Typhoon Francisco has reached its peak intensity of 260 km/h (160 mph) which makes it equivalent to a Category 5 hurricane on the SSHWS.
- 0900 UTC — The JTWC initiates advisories on the tropical depression, previously located to the northeast of Guam.

October 20

- 0900 UTC — The JTWC issues its final advisory on Tropical Depression 27W.
- 1200 UTC — The JTWC reports that Super Typhoon Francisco has weakened into a typhoon and become equivalent to a Category 4 hurricane on the SSHWS.
- 1200 UTC — The JTWC initiates advisories on the tropical depression that was located to the northeast of Pohnpei, and assigns it the designation 28W.
- 1800 UTC — The JMA and CMA report that Tropical Depression 28W has become a tropical storm, with the former naming it Lekima.

October 21

- 0000 UTC — The JTWC reports that Typhoon Francisco has weakened and become equivalent to a Category 3 hurricane on the SSHWS.
- 0600 UTC — The JTWC reports that Typhoon Francisco has weakened and become equivalent to a Category 2 hurricane on the SSHWS
- 0000 UTC — The JTWC reports that Tropical Depression Lekima, has intensified into a tropical storm.
- 0600 UTC — The JMA and CMA report that Tropical Storm Lekima, has intensified into a severe tropical storm.
- 1800 UTC — PAGASA reports that Typhoon Francisco has entered the Philippine area of responsibility and names it Urduja.
- 2100 UTC — The JTWC reports that Tropical Storm Lekima has become a typhoon and equivalent to a Category 1 hurricane on the SSHWS.

October 22

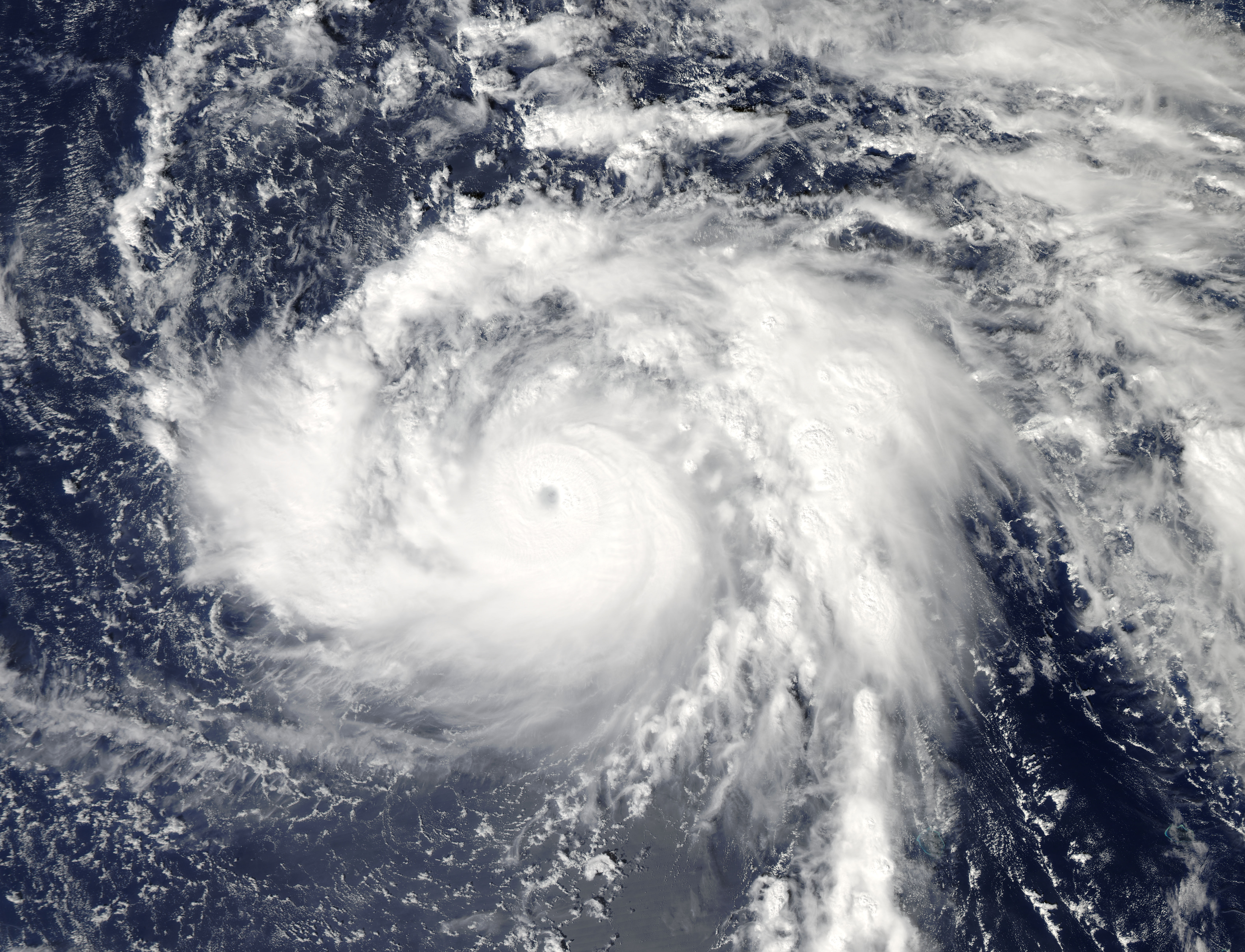
Typhoon Lekima started to underwent rapid deepening as a Category 3 typhoon

- 0000 UTC — The JTWC reports that Typhoon Francisco has weakened and become equivalent to a Category 1 hurricane on the SSHWS.
- 0000 UTC — The CMA reports that Severe Tropical Storm Lekima has intensified into a typhoon.
- 0300 UTC — The JMA reports that Severe Tropical Storm Lekima has intensified into a typhoon.
- 0600 UTC — The JTWC reports that Typhoon Lekima has become equivalent to a Category 3 hurricane on the SSHWS.
- 1200 UTC — The JTWC reports that Typhoon Lekima has become equivalent to a Category 4 hurricane on the SSHWS.
- 1800 UTC — The JTWC reports that Typhoon Lekima has reached its peak intensity with 1-minute sustained windspeeds of 260 km/h (160 mph), which made it a super typhoon and equivalent to a Category 5 hurricane on the SSHWS.
- 1800 UTC — The JMA issues its final advisory on Tropical Depression 27W.

October 23

- 0000 UTC — The JMA reports that Typhoon Lekima has reached its peak intensity with 10-minute sustained windspeeds of 215 km/h (130 mph).

October 24

- 0600 UTC — The JTWC reports that Super Typhoon Lekima has weakened and become equivalent to a Category 4 hurricane on the SSHWS.
- 0600 UTC — The JTWC reports that Typhoon Francisco, has weakened into a tropical storm.
- 1800 UTC — The JMA reports that Typhoon Francisco, has weakened into a severe tropical storm.
- 1800 UTC — The JTWC reports that Super Typhoon Lekima has weakened into a typhoon.

October 25

- 0600 UTC — The JTWC reports that Typhoon Lekima has weakened and become equivalent to a Category 3 hurricane on the SSHWS.
- 1800 UTC — The JTWC reports that Typhoon Lekima has weakened slightly and become equivalent to a Category 2 hurricane on the SSHWS.
- 2100 UTC — The JTWC issues its final advisory on Tropical Storm Francisco, as it transitioned into an extratropical cyclone.

October 26

- 0000 UTC — The JTWC reports that Typhoon Lekima has weakened and become equivalent to a Category 1 hurricane on the SSHWS.
- 0600 UTC — The JMA reports that Severe Tropical Storm Francisco, has degenerated into an extratropical low.
- 0900 UTC — The JTWC issues its final advisory on Typhoon Lekima, as it rapidly merged with a baroclinic zone and transitioned into an extratropical cyclone.
- 1200 UTC — The JMA and CMA report that Typhoon Lekima, has degenerated into an extratropical low.
- 1800 UTC — The JMA stops monitoring the extratropical remnants of Typhoon Francisco as they dissipate.

October 27

- 1800 UTC — The JMA and CMA report that a tropical depression has developed, about 270 km (170 mi) to the southwest of Hagåtña, Guam.

October 28

- 1800 UTC — The JMA stops monitoring the extratropical low that was Typhoon Lekima, as it moves into the Eastern Pacific Ocean.
- 2100 UTC – PAGASA names the tropical depression: Vinta.

October 29

- 0000 UTC — The JTWC initiates advisories on Tropical Depression Vinta and assigns it the designation 29W.
- 1800 UTC — The JMA reports that Tropical Depression Vinta has developed into a tropical storm and names it Krosa.

October 30

- 1200 UTC — The JMA reports that Tropical Storm Krosa (Vinta) has intensified into a severe tropical storm.

October 31

- 0600 UTC — The JMA reports that Severe Tropical Storm Krosa (Vinta) has intensified into a typhoon.

=== November ===
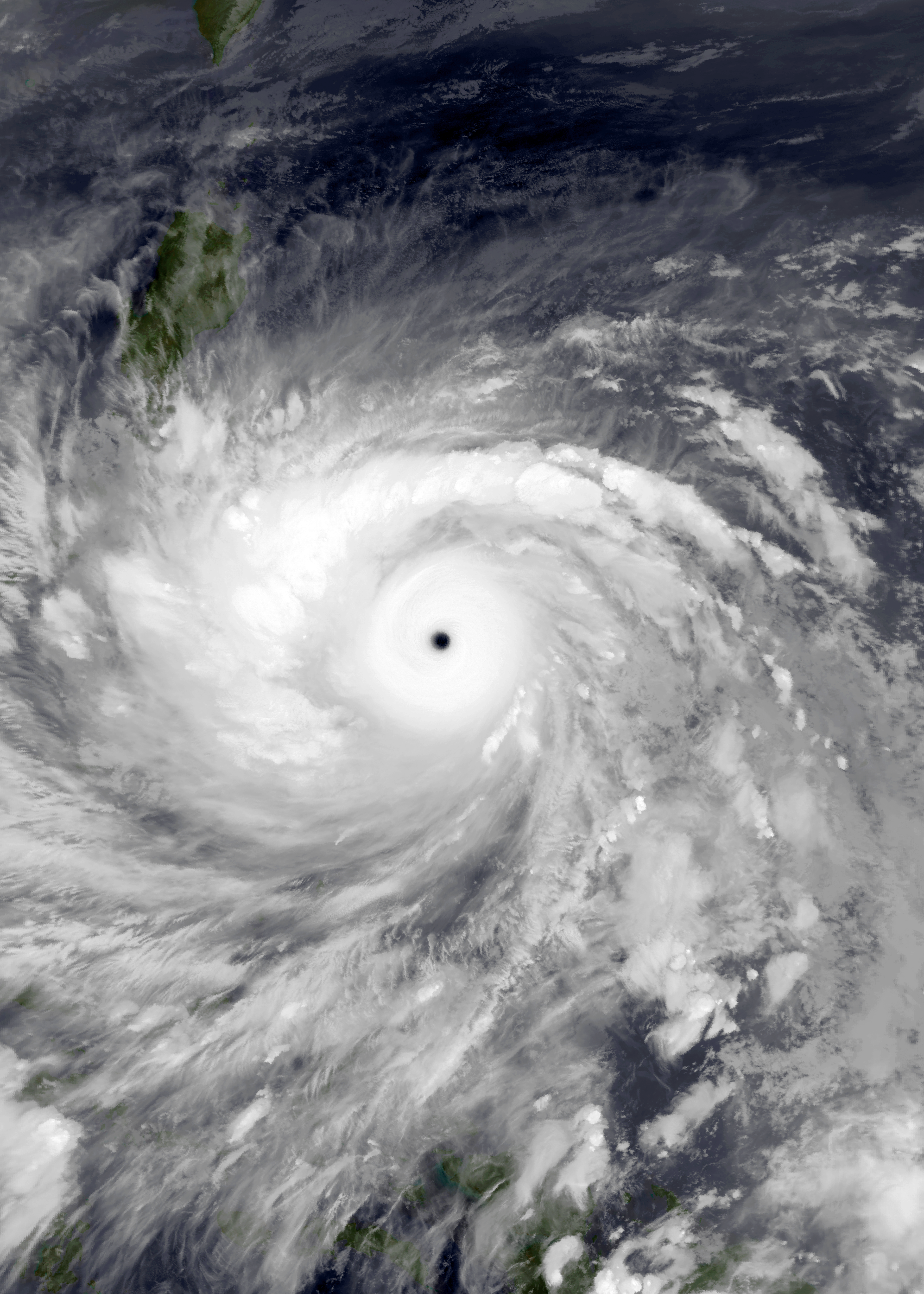
Typhoon Haiyan (Yolanda) approaching the Philippines on November 7

November 1

- 0000 UTC — The JTWC reports that Typhoon Krosa (Vinta), has become equivalent to a Category 2 hurricane on the SSHWS.
- 1800 UTC — The JTWC reports that Typhoon Krosa (Vinta), has become equivalent to a Category 3 hurricane on the SSHWS.
- 1800 UTC — The JMA briefly notes that a tropical depression, has developed about 280 km (175 mi) to the south of Palau.
- 1800 UTC — The JMA reports that Typhoon Krosa (Vinta) has reached its peak intensity, with 10-minute sustained windspeeds of 140 km/h (85 mph).

November 2

November 3

- 0000 UTC — The JMA reports that Typhoon Krosa (Vinta) has weakened into a severe tropical storm.
- 0000 UTC — The JMA and CMA report that a tropical depression has formed about 225 km (140 mi) to the northwest of Palau.
- 0600 UTC — The JTWC initiates advisories on the tropical depression, and designates it as Tropical Depression 30W.
- 0600 UTC — The JMA, JTWC and CMA report that Tropical Depression 31W has formed about 1,600 km (995 mi) to the southeast of Hagåtña, Guam.
- 1200 UTC — The JMA reports that Severe Tropical Storm Krosa (Vinta) has weakened into a tropical storm.
- 1800 UTC — PAGASA names the tropical depression: Wilma.

November 4

- 0000 UTC — The JMA, JTWC and CMA all report that Tropical Depression 31W has intensified into a tropical storm, with the JMA naming it Haiyan (Yolanda).
- 0600 UTC — The JMA reports that Tropical Storm Krosa (Vinta) has weakened into a tropical depression.
- 1800 UTC — The CMA reports that Tropical Storm Haiyan (Yolanda) has intensified into a severe tropical storm.

November 5

- 0000 UTC — The JMA reports that Tropical Depression Krosa (Vinta) dissipated, as it made landfall on Vietnam.
- 0000 UTC — The JMA reports that Tropical Storm Haiyan (Yolanda) has intensified into a severe tropical storm.
- 0000 UTC — The JTWC reports that Tropical Storm Haiyan (Yolanda) has become equivalent to a Category 1 hurricane on the SSHWS.
- 0600 UTC — The CMA reports that Severe Tropical Storm Haiyan (Yolanda) has intensified into a typhoon.
- 1200 UTC — The JMA reports that Severe Tropical Storm Haiyan (Yolanda) has intensified into a typhoon.
- 1200 UTC — The JTWC reports that Typhoon Haiyan (Yolanda) has become equivalent to a Category 2 hurricane on the SSHWS.
- 1200 UTC — PAGASA issues its first advisory on Typhoon Haiyan and formally names it Yolanda.
- 1200 UTC — The JTWC reports that Tropical Depression Wilma has intensified into a tropical storm with peak 1-minute sustained windspeeds of 65 km/h (40 mph).
- 1800 UTC — The CMA reports that Typhoon Haiyan (Yolanda) has become a severe typhoon.
- 1800 UTC — The JTWC reports that Typhoon Haiyan (Yolanda) has become equivalent to a Category 3 hurricane on the SSHWS.

November 6

- 0000 UTC — The CMA reports that Severe Typhoon Haiyan (Yolanda) has intensified into a super typhoon.
- 0000 UTC — The JTWC reports that Typhoon Haiyan (Yolanda) has intensified into a super typhoon and become equivalent to a Category 4 hurricane on the SSHWS.
- 0600 UTC — The JTWC issues its final advisory on Tropical Depression Wilma.
- 0600 UTC — The JMA issues its final advisory on Tropical Depression Wilma.
- 1200 UTC — The JTWC reports that Super Typhoon Haiyan (Yolanda) has become equivalent to a Category 5 hurricane on the SSHWS.

November 7

- 1200 UTC — The JMA reports that Typhoon Haiyan (Yolanda) has peaked with 10-minute sustained winds of 230 km/h (145 mph) and a central pressure of 895 hPa (26.43 inHg).
- 1800 UTC — The CMA reports that Super Typhoon Haiyan (Yolanda) has peaked with 2-minute sustained winds of 280 km/h (175 mph) and a central pressure of 890 hPa (26.28 inHg).
- 1800 UTC — The JTWC reports that Super Typhoon Haiyan (Yolanda) has peaked with 1-minute sustained winds of 315 km/h (195 mph).
- 1800 UTC — PAGASA reports that Super Typhoon Haiyan (Yolanda) has peaked with 10-minute sustained winds of 235 km/h (145 mph) and a central pressure of 914 hPa (26.99 inHg).
- 1800 UTC — The CMA stops monitoring Tropical Depression Wilma.
- 20:40 UTC — PAGASA reports that Typhoon Haiyan (Yolanda) has made landfall over Guiuan, Eastern Samar.
- 23:00 UTC — PAGASA reports that Typhoon Haiyan (Yolanda) has made landfall over Tolosa, Leyte.

November 8

- 01:40 UTC — PAGASA reports that Typhoon Haiyan (Yolanda) has made landfall over Daanbantayan in Cebu Province.
- 02:40 UTC — PAGASA reports that Typhoon Haiyan (Yolanda) has made landfall on Bantayan island.
- 04:00 UTC — PAGASA reports that Typhoon Haiyan (Yolanda) has made landfall on Panay island near Conception, Iloilo.
- 0600 UTC — The CMA reports that Super Typhoon Haiyan (Yolanda) has weakened into a severe typhoon.
- 1200 UTC — The JTWC reports that Super Typhoon Haiyan (Yolanda) has weakened and become equivalent to a Category 4 hurricane on the SSHWS.
- 1500 UTC — The CMA reports that Severe Typhoon Haiyan (Yolanda) has entered the southeastern South China Sea.
- 1800 UTC — The JTWC reports that Super Typhoon Haiyan (Yolanda) has weakened into a typhoon.

November 9

- 0600 UTC — PAGASA issues its final advisory on Typhoon Haiyan (Yolanda), as the system has left its area of responsibility.
- 0600 UTC — The JTWC reports that Typhoon Haiyan (Yolanda) has weakened and become equivalent to a Category 3 hurricane on the SSHWS.
- 1800 UTC — The JTWC reports that Typhoon Haiyan (Yolanda) has weakened and become equivalent to a Category 2 hurricane on the SSHWS.

November 10

- 0600 UTC — The CMA reports that Severe Typhoon Haiyan (Yolanda) has weakened into a typhoon.
- 0600 UTC — The JTWC reports that Typhoon Haiyan (Yolanda) has weakened and become equivalent to a Category 2 hurricane on the SSHWS.
- 1200 UTC — The JTWC reports that Typhoon Haiyan (Yolanda) has weakened and become equivalent to a Category 1 hurricane on the SSHWS.
- 1800 UTC — The JMA reports that Typhoon Haiyan (Yolanda) has weakened into a severe tropical storm.
- 2100 UTC — PAGASA reports that a tropical depression has developed about 950 km (590 mi) to the southeast of Hinatuan on the island of Mindanao.
- 2100 UTC — The CMA reports that Typhoon Haiyan (Yolanda) has made landfall on the coast of the Vietnamese Quảng Ninh province.

November 11

- 0000 UTC — The JMA reports that Severe Tropical Storm Haiyan (Yolanda) has weakened into a tropical storm.
- 0000 UTC — The JMA starts monitoring Tropical Depression Zoraida.
- 0000 UTC — The CMA reports that Typhoon Haiyan (Yolanda) has weakened into a severe tropical storm.
- 0000 UTC — The JTWC reports that Typhoon Haiyan (Yolanda) has weakened into a tropical storm and issues its final advisory on the system.
- 0100 UTC — The CMA reports that Severe Tropical Storm Haiyan (Yolanda) moved into the Chinese province of Guangxi.
- 0600 UTC — The JMA reports that Tropical Storm Haiyan (Yolanda) has weakened into a tropical depression.
- 0600 UTC — The CMA reports that Severe Tropical Storm Haiyan (Yolanda) has weakened into a tropical storm.
- 1200 UTC — The CMA reports that Tropical Storm Haiyan (Yolanda) has weakened into a tropical depression.
- 1200 UTC — The JMA stops monitoring Tropical Depression Haiyan (Yolanda), as it dissipates over Guangxi.
- 1500 UTC — The CMA stops monitoring Tropical Depression Haiyan (Yolanda).

November 12

- 0000 UTC — The CMA starts monitoring Tropical Depression Zoraida.

November 14

- 1200 UTC — The JMA reports that Tropical Depression Zoraida has intensified into a tropical storm and names it Podul, as it peaks with 10-minute sustained wind speeds of 65 km/h (40 mph).
- 1200 UTC — The CMA reports that Tropical Depression Podul (Zoraida) has intensified into a tropical storm.
- 1200 UTC — The JTWC initiates advisories on Tropical Depression Podul (Zoraida) and assigns it the designation 32W.

November 15

- 0000 UTC — The JMA and CMA report that Tropical Storm Podul (Zoraida) has weakened into a tropical depression, while located over the Vietnamese province of Khánh Hòa.
- 0000 UTC — The JTWC issues its final advisory on Tropical Depression Podul (Zoraida).
- 1200 UTC — The JMA and CMA stop monitoring Tropical Depression Podul (Zoraida) as it dissipates over the Vietnamese province of Đồng Nai.

November 19

- 1200 UTC — The JMA reports that a tropical depression has formed about 370 km (230 mi) to the east of Kuala Lumpur, Malaysia.

November 22

- 0600 UTC — The JMA issues its final advisory on the tropical depression, as it passes into the North Indian Ocean where it eventually develops into Cyclone Lehar.

=== December ===
December 3

- 0000 UTC — The JMA reports that a tropical depression has formed about 650 km (405 mi) to the north-northwest of Hagåtña, Guam.
- 0600 UTC — The JTWC starts to monitor the tropical depression.
- 1200 UTC — The JTWC initiates advisories on the tropical depression and assigns it the designation 33W.

December 4

- 0000 UTC — The JMA and JTWC stop monitoring Tropical Depression 33W, as it weakens into a tropical disturbance.
- There were no further tropical depressions reported before the year ended, after the JMA and JTWC stopped monitoring Tropical Depression 33W.

== See also ==
- 2013 Pacific typhoon season
- Timeline of the 2013 Pacific hurricane season
- Timeline of the 2013 Atlantic hurricane season
