= List of storms named Vinta =

The name Vinta has been used for three tropical cyclones in the Philippine Area of Responsibility by PAGASA in the Western Pacific Ocean. It refers to a vinta, a traditional outrigger boat from Mindanao.

- Typhoon Nida (2009) (T0922, 26W, Vinta) – Powerful Category 5 super typhoon that remained over the open ocean.
- Typhoon Krosa (2013) (T1329, 29W, Vinta) – struck the Philippines.
- Typhoon Tembin (2017) (T1727, 33W, Vinta) – caused 266 deaths in the Philippines.

The name Vinta was retired following the 2017 Pacific typhoon season and was replaced with Verbena, which refers to the verbena, a herbaceous flowering plant.

- Typhoon Koto (T2527, 33W, Verbena) – strong and erratic typhoon that affected Philippines and Vietnam.

Preceded by Urbano	Pacific typhoon season names Verbena	Succeeded by Wilma
