= Typhoon Krosa (2013) =

Pacific typhoon in 2013

Typhoon Krosa (Vinta)
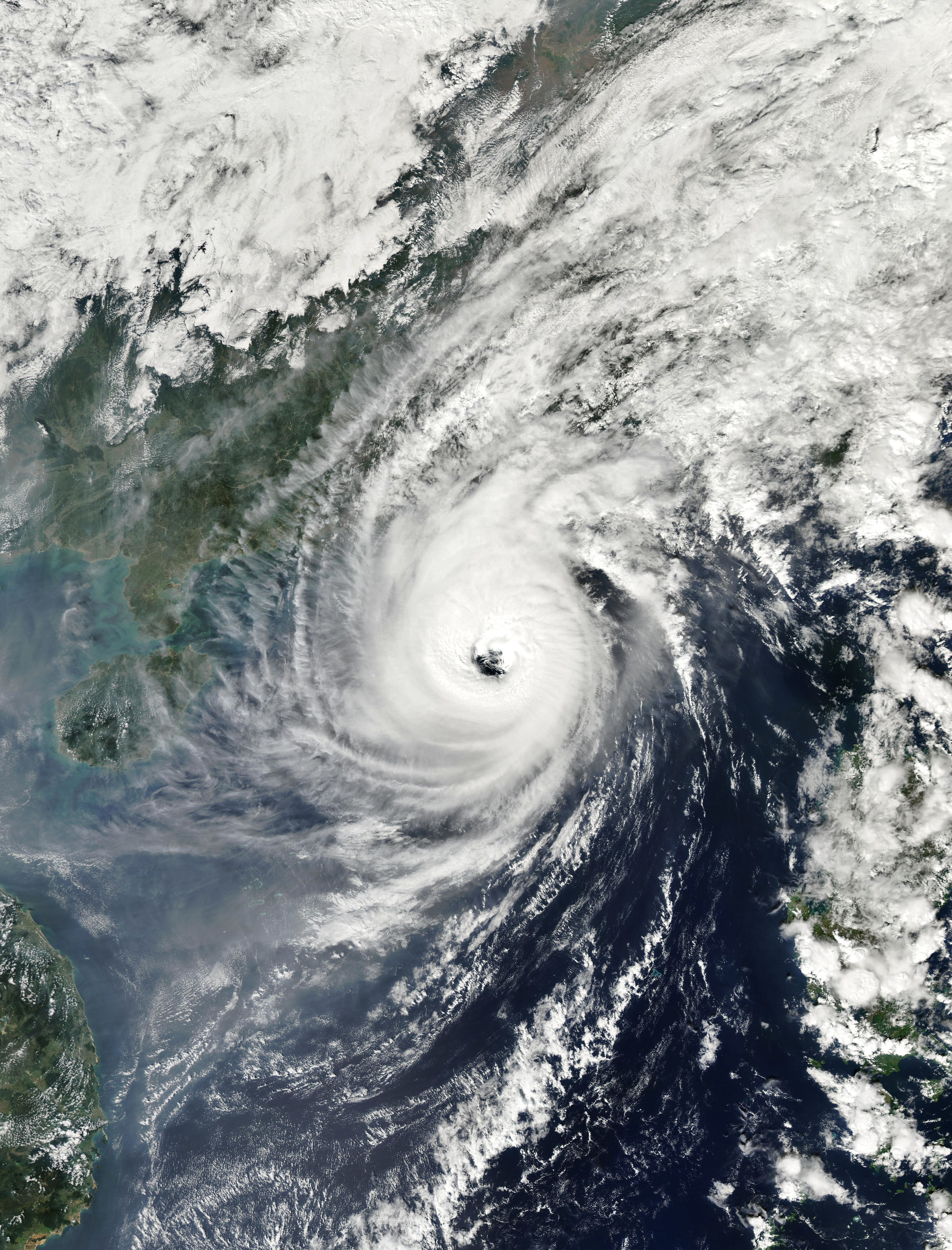
- Typhoon Krosa at peak intensity in the South China Sea on November 2

Meteorological history
- Formed: October 27, 2013
- Dissipated: November 5, 2013

Typhoon
- 10-minute sustained (JMA)
- Highest winds: 140 km/h (85 mph)
- Lowest pressure: 970 hPa (mbar); 28.64 inHg

Category 3-equivalent typhoon
- 1-minute sustained (SSHWS/JTWC)
- Highest winds: 195 km/h (120 mph)
- Lowest pressure: 944 hPa (mbar); 27.88 inHg

Overall effects
- Fatalities: 4
- Damage: $6.4 million (2013 USD)
- Areas affected: Philippines, China (especially Hong Kong), Vietnam
- IBTrACS
- Part of the 2013 Pacific typhoon season

Typhoon Krosa, known in the Philippines as Typhoon Vinta, was a typhoon that made landfall in the northern Philippines in late October 2013. Forming on October 27 near Guam, the storm slowly intensified while moving westward. Krosa developed an eye and became a typhoon before striking Luzon on October 31. The storm weakened over land, but re-intensified over the South China Sea, reaching peak winds of 150 km/h (93 mph) on November 2 off the southeast coast of China. Typhoon Krosa stalled and encountered unfavorable conditions, resulting in quick weakening. By November 3, it had weakened to tropical storm status, and was no longer being warned on by the next day. In northern Luzon, Krosa damaged 32,000 houses, including 3,000 that were destroyed, and caused four fatalities. High winds and rainfall left ₱277 million (PHP, $6.4 million USD) in damage. (Note: All damage totals are in 2013 values of their respective currencies.)

Not long after Krosa dissipated, the Philippines were again struck by the more devastating and extremely violent Typhoon Haiyan, which caused much more damage and destruction.

== Meteorological history ==
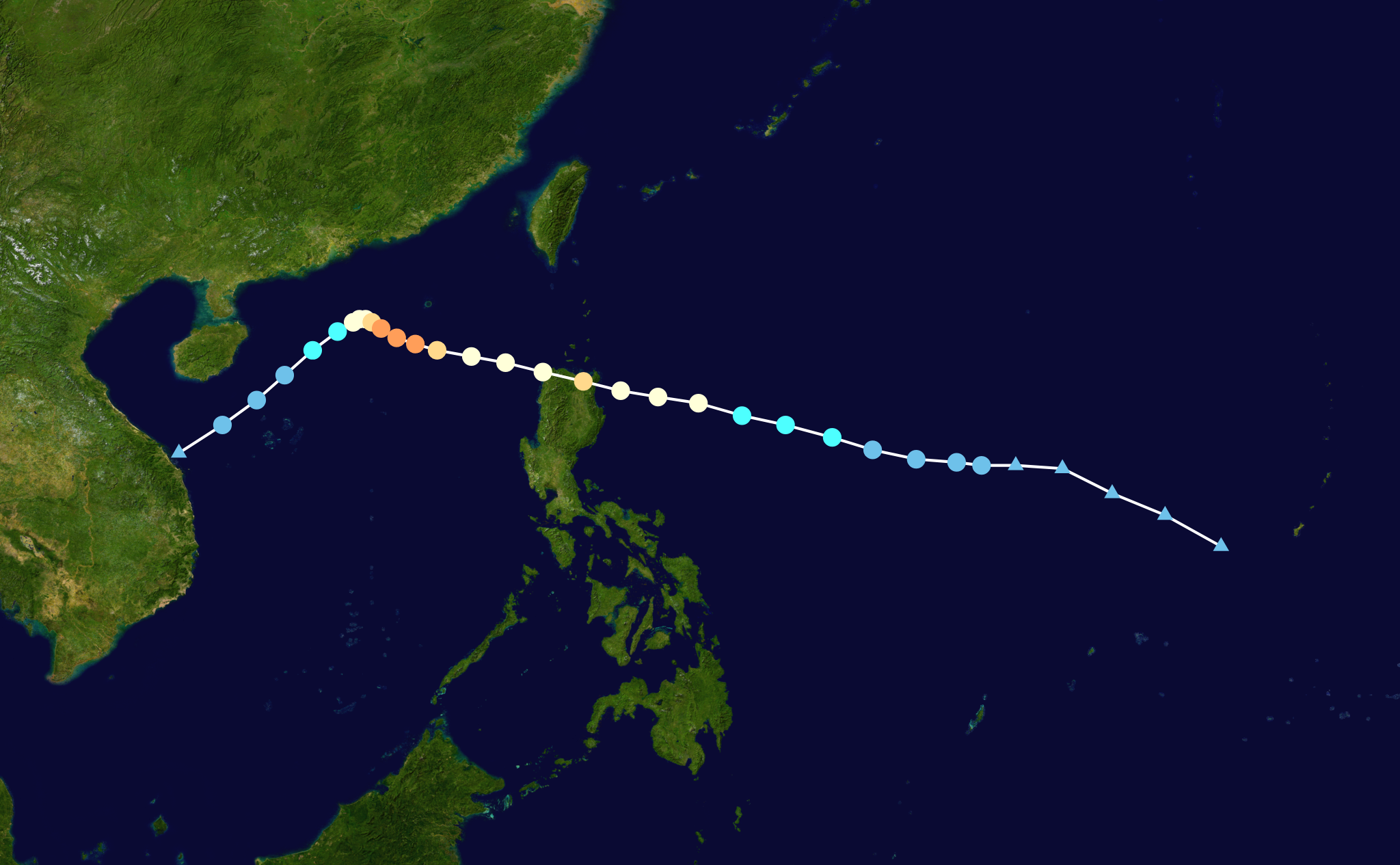
Map plotting the storm's track and intensity, according to the Saffir–Simpson scale Map key Saffir–Simpson scale Tropical depression (≤38 mph, ≤62 km/h) Tropical storm (39–73 mph, 63–118 km/h) Category 1 (74–95 mph, 119–153 km/h) Category 2 (96–110 mph, 154–177 km/h) Category 3 (111–129 mph, 178–208 km/h) Category 4 (130–156 mph, 209–251 km/h) Category 5 (≥157 mph, ≥252 km/h) Unknown Storm type Tropical cyclone Subtropical cyclone Extratropical cyclone, remnant low, tropical disturbance, or monsoon depression

On October 27, an area of convection with a broad circulation persisted southeast of Guam, and slowly consolidated due to moderate wind shear and westerly outflow. That day, the Japan Meteorological Agency (JMA) (Note: The Japan Meteorological Agency is the official Regional Specialized Meteorological Center for the western Pacific Ocean.) classified the system as a tropical depression about 380 km (235 mi) to the southeast of Hagåtña, Guam. At 2100 UTC on October 28, the Philippine Atmospheric, Geophysical and Astronomical Services Administration (PAGASA) began issuing advisories on the depression, giving it the local name Vinta. The next day, the JMA upgraded the depression to Tropical Storm Krosa, (Note: The name Krosa (Khmer: ក្រសារ, [krɑ.ˈsaː]) was contributed by Cambodia and means crane in Khmer.) and the Joint Typhoon Warning Center (JTWC) (Note: The Joint Typhoon Warning Center is a joint United States Navy – United States Air Force task force that issues tropical cyclone warnings for the western Pacific Ocean and other regions.) also classified it as Tropical Depression 29W. By that time, the storm was moving steadily westward due to the subtropical ridge to the north. With the warm waters of the Philippine Sea, lessening wind shear, and improving outflow, Krosa gradually strengthened, and the JTWC also upgraded Krosa to tropical storm status on October 30 after an eye feature developed.

While approaching northern Luzon on October 29, Krosa quickly intensified as the initial eye feature organized into a well-defined eye. Late on October 30, the JTWC upgraded Krosa to typhoon status, and the next day, both PAGASA and JMA followed suit. On October 31, Krosa made landfall in northeastern Luzon near Cagayan, and developed a symmetric eyewall while initially moving over land. Land interaction weakened the eye by the time Krosa emerged into the South China Sea late on October 31. The next day, PAGASA discontinued advisories after the typhoon exited the region. Convection rebuilt around the center, with continued favorable conditions allowing for restrengthening.

Late on November 1, a large eye redeveloped, and the JTWC estimated Krosa attained peak 1 minute sustained winds of 185 km/h (115 mph). Early the next day, the JMA also estimated the typhoon reached peak 10 minute winds of 140 km/h (87 mph). Later, increasing wind shear caused the eye to deteriorate, and Krosa began slowing about 260 km (160 mi) east-southeast of Hong Kong after reaching the western edge of the subtropical ridge. After remaining nearly stationary, Krosa began moving steadily to the west-southwest due to a new ridge. The convection continued to weaken due to continued shear and cooler waters from upwelling, and Krosa deteriorated to tropical storm status on November 3. The next day, the JTWC issued its final advisory after the circulation became exposed from the convection. Also on November 4, the JMA downgraded Krosa to tropical depression status off the northeast Vietnam coast. The system dissipated at 0000 UTC on November 5.

== Preparations and impact ==
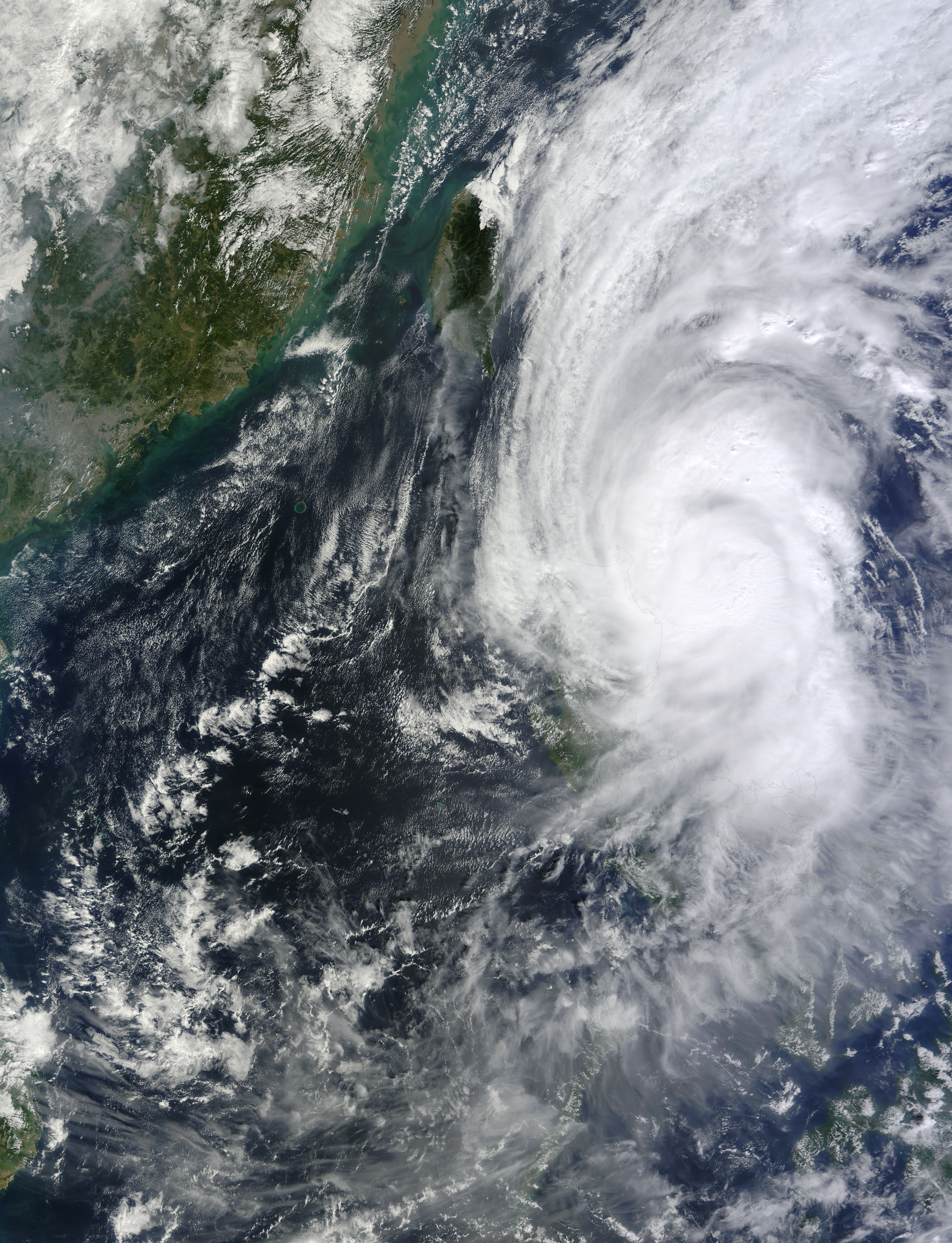
Severe Tropical Storm Krosa approaching Luzon on October 31

Before Krosa struck the Philippines, PAGASA issued a number 3 warning signal for portions of northern Luzon, where winds were expected to reach over 100 km/h (62 mph). The agency noted for the potential for flooding and landslides. High winds knocked down trees across Luzon, and left about 80% of Cagayan province without power, as well as some areas without internet or cellphone service. Portions of the Pan-Philippine Highway were blocked, and in Lal-Lo, Cagayan, a car crashed into a gasoline truck due to power outages. Agriculture damage was estimated at ₱273 million (US$6.31 million), (Note: The total was originally reported in Philippine pesos. Total converted via the XE.com website.) occurring just before the start of the harvest. Across the island, the typhoon damaged 37,523 houses, including 3,897 that were destroyed, forcing 65,648 people to evacuate to storm shelters. Overall, Krosa killed four people in the Philippines, and left ₱277 million (US$6.4 million) in damage. After the storm, workers quickly restored power lines, while the government provided monetary assistance to storm-ravaged families, after Cagayan was declared a state of calamity. Members of the Philippine military and Department of Public Works and Highways worked to clean up following the storm.

The China National Meteorological Centre issued a "yellow alert", the second-lowest of the four level warning system, for Hainan due to the threat of the storm. The agency recommended boats to return to port. Agencies in Vietnam also warned for the potential of heavy rainfall due to the dissipating Tropical Depression Krosa, and released water from three dams to prevent overflow.

== See also ==
- Other tropical cyclones named Krosa
- Other tropical cyclones named Vinta
- Weather of 2013
- Tropical cyclones in 2013
- Timeline of the 2013 Pacific typhoon season
- Typhoon Angela (1989) – a stronger typhoon that had a near-identical path to Krosa.
- Typhoon Cimaron (2006) – a violent typhoon which took a comparable trajectory across Luzon and the South China Sea.
- Typhoon Nuri (2008) – similar typhoon that struck northern Luzon.
- Typhoon Kalmaegi (2014) – a costly typhoon that affected Northern Luzon.
- Typhoon Mangkhut (2018) – struck Northern Luzon as a category 5 typhoon causing widespread damage.
- Tropical Storm Ma-on (2022) – a moderate tropical storm that took a comparable track.
- Typhoon Doksuri (2023) – devastating typhoon which ravaged over Extreme Northern Luzon.
- Typhoon Yinxing (2024) – a powerful typhoon that also traversed the same areas as Krosa.
