= Cyclone Lehar =

North Indian cyclone in 2013

Very Severe Cyclonic Storm Lehar
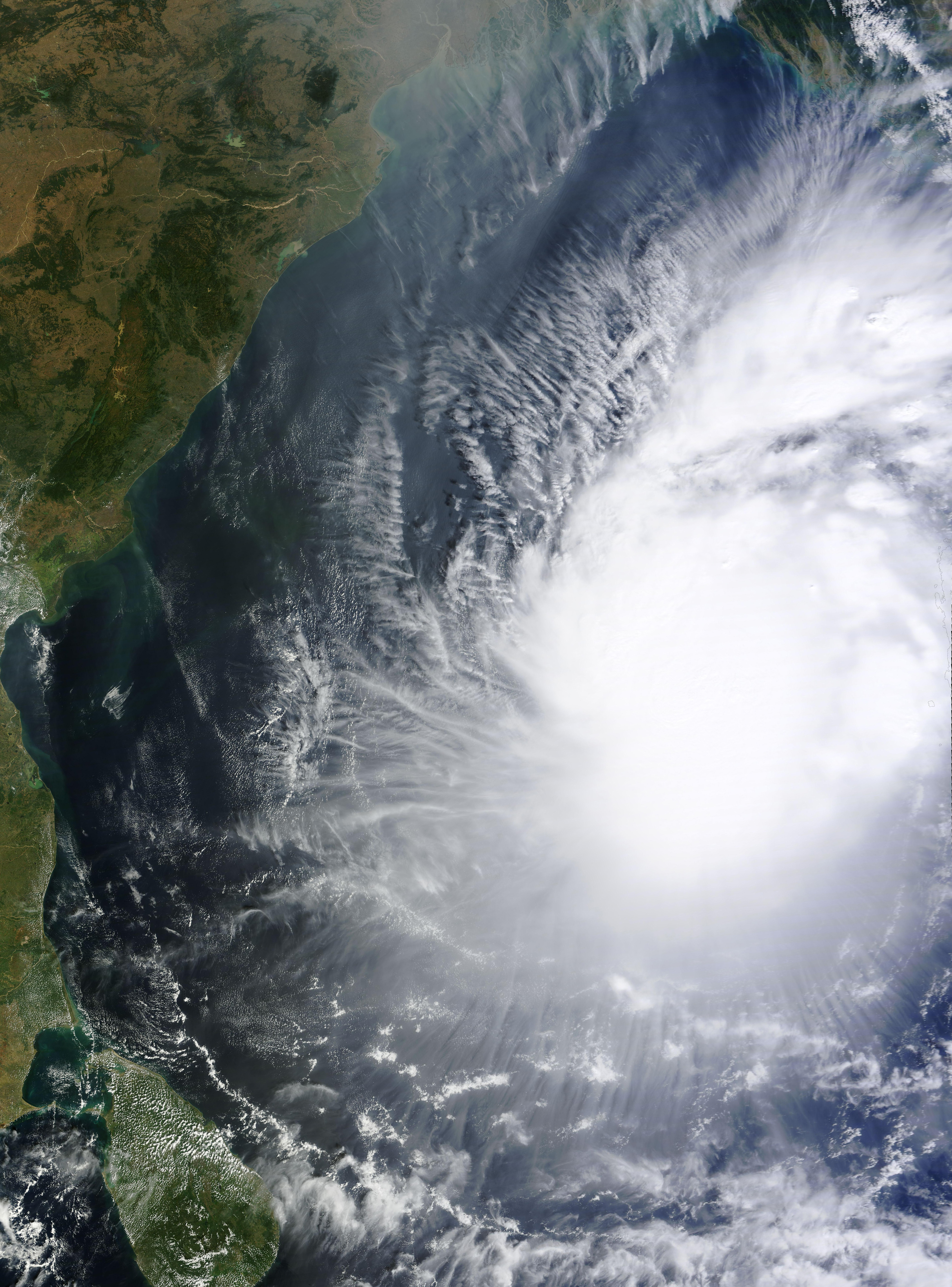
- Cyclone Lehar near peak intensity on 26 November

Meteorological history
- Formed: 19 November 2013
- Dissipated: 28 November 2013

Very severe cyclonic storm
- 3-minute sustained (IMD)
- Highest winds: 140 km/h (85 mph)
- Lowest pressure: 980 hPa (mbar); 28.94 inHg

Category 1-equivalent tropical cyclone
- 1-minute sustained (SSHWS/JTWC)
- Highest winds: 140 km/h (85 mph)
- Lowest pressure: 967 hPa (mbar); 28.56 inHg

Overall effects
- Fatalities: None
- Damage: Minimal
- Areas affected: Thailand, Malaysia, Malay Peninsula, Andaman and Nicobar Islands, Southern India
- IBTrACS
- Part of the 2013 Pacific typhoon and North Indian Ocean cyclone seasons

Very Severe Cyclonic Storm Lehar (Note: The name Lehar (Hindi: लहर; [lɛ.ɦɛɾ]) was contributed by India and means "wave" in Hindi.) was a tropical cyclone that primarily affected the Andaman and Nicobar Islands and the Indian state of Andhra Pradesh. Lehar was the second most intense tropical cyclone of the 2013 season, surpassed by Cyclone Phailin, as well as one of the two relatively strong cyclones that affected Southern India in November 2013, the other being Cyclone Helen.

The origins of Lehar can be tracked back to an area of low pressure that formed in the South China Sea on 18 November. The system slowly drifted westwards and entered the Bay of Bengal, where it quickly consolidated into a depression on 23 November. It moved west-northwest into an improving environment for further development before the system was named Lehar on 24 November, after it had developed into a cyclonic storm and passed over the Andaman and Nicobar Islands into the Bay of Bengal. Lehar gradually intensified further into a very severe cyclonic storm, equivalent to a category 1 hurricane on the Saffir–Simpson hurricane wind scale (SSHWS), reaching its peak on 26 November, with 3-minute sustained wind speeds of 140 km/h (87 mph) and a minimum central pressure of 982 mbar (29.0 inHg).

Moving along a generally west-northwestward path in the following days, the storm passed over an area having cooler waters and a moderate vertical wind shear. The storm's low-level circulation center (LLCC) started losing its structure, triggering a weakening trend. Lehar rapidly weakened to a Depression on 28 November and its fully exposed LLCC made its second landfall over the coast of Andhra Pradesh near Machilipatnam. The same day, it was last noted as a well marked low-pressure area over Andhra Pradesh.

Extensive preparation was done in the wake of the storm by the authorities of the coastal districts of Andhra Pradesh and Odisha, including the evacuation of 45,000 people in low-lying areas. The storm's rapid weakening before landfall led to no reported fatalities and minimal damage.

== Meteorological history ==
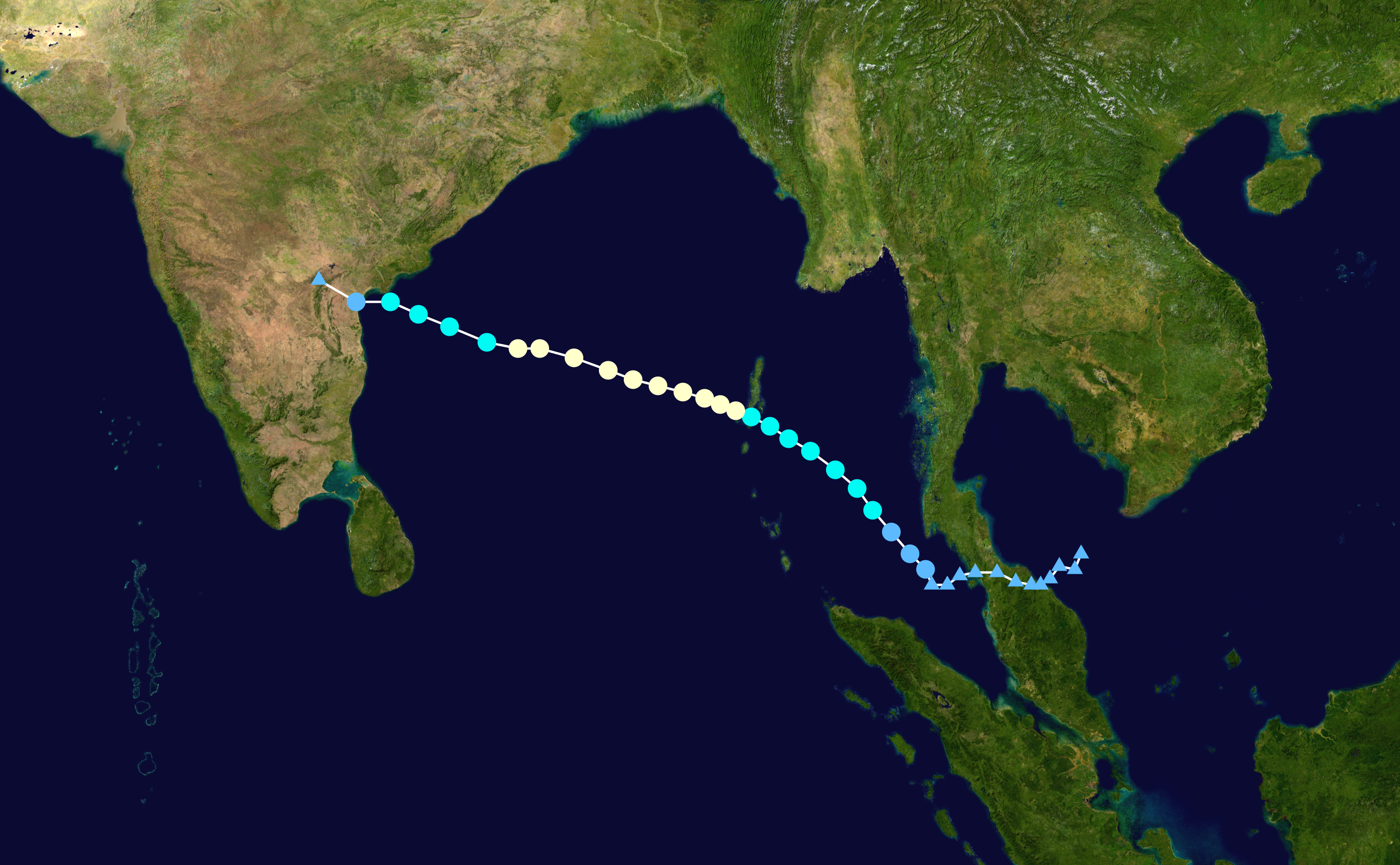
Map plotting the storm's track and intensity, according to the Saffir–Simpson scale Map key Saffir–Simpson scale Tropical depression (≤38 mph, ≤62 km/h) Tropical storm (39–73 mph, 63–118 km/h) Category 1 (74–95 mph, 119–153 km/h) Category 2 (96–110 mph, 154–177 km/h) Category 3 (111–129 mph, 178–208 km/h) Category 4 (130–156 mph, 209–251 km/h) Category 5 (≥157 mph, ≥252 km/h) Unknown Storm type Tropical cyclone Subtropical cyclone Extratropical cyclone, remnant low, tropical disturbance, or monsoon depression

On 19 November 2013 the Japan Meteorological Agency reported that a tropical depression had developed, about 365 km (225 mi) to the west of Kuala Lumpur, Malaysia. Over the next few days the system moved towards the west-northwest and moved into an extremely favourable environment, for further development while located over the Malay Peninsula during 21 November. The system was subsequently last noted by the JMA during the next day, as it crossed 100°E and moved into the Andaman Sea.

There, it developed a well-defined low-level circulation center (LLCC). The Joint Typhoon Warning Center (JTWC) issued a Tropical Cyclone Formation Alert (TCFA) on the system, assuming that it would intensify further as it moves into warmer sections of the Bay of Bengal. Tracking westward at over 08 knots (15 km/h; 9.2 mph), the system gradually intensified over the next 24 hours. Early on 23 November, the JTWC classified the system as a Tropical Storm, designating it with 05B. A couple of hours later, the India Meteorological Department (IMD) started tracking this system as a Depression. It was initially assigned the code BOB 07. Early the next day, the IMD reported that BOB 07 had reached deep depression status, and immediately afterwards, they upgraded BOB 07 into a cyclonic storm, naming it Lehar. Being located in an area of moderate vertical wind shear of around 15 knots (28 km/h; 17 mph), convection gradually consolidated around the LLCC, though being slightly displaced towards the northwest. Later that day, Lehar developed a weak microwave eye-like feature.

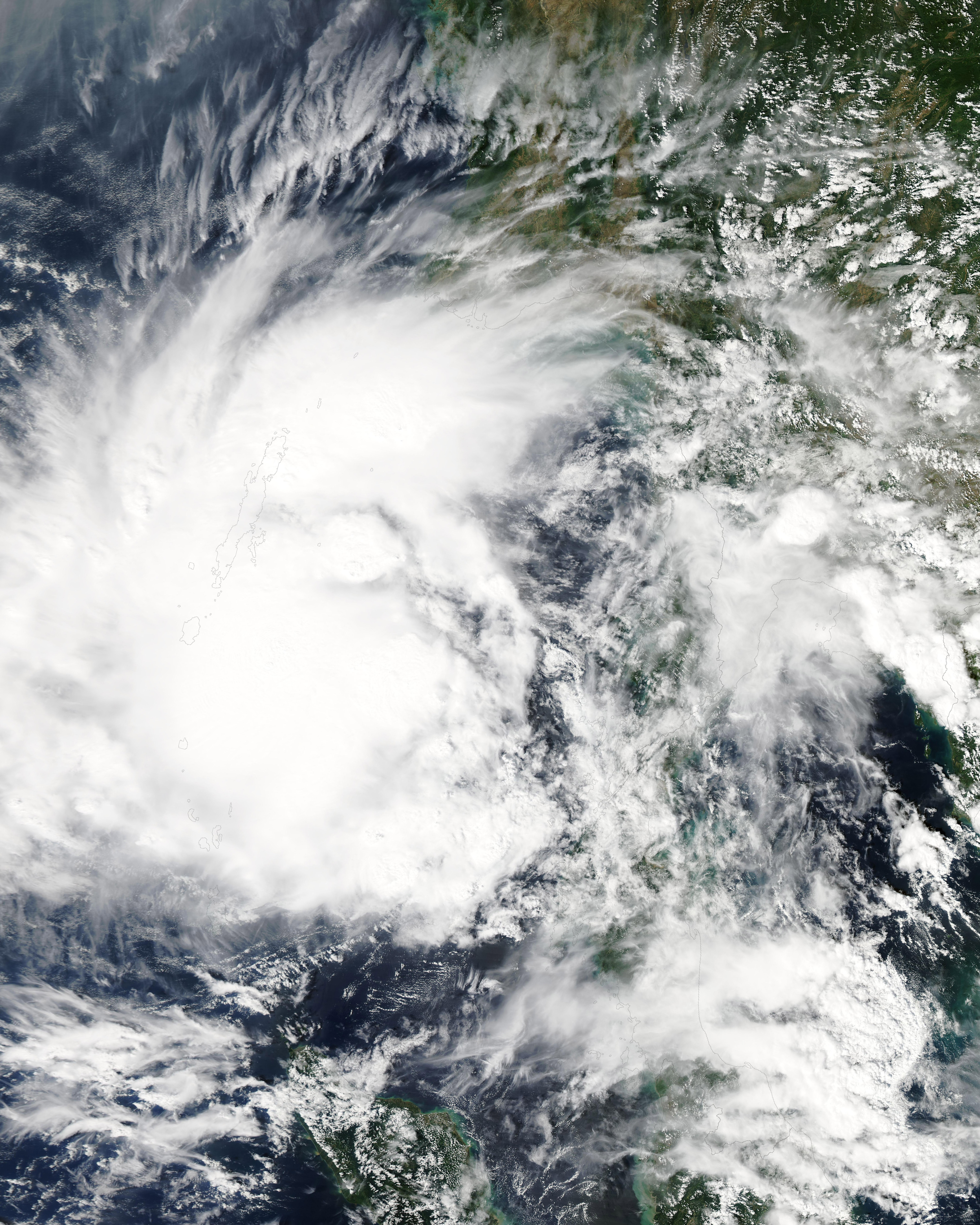
Lehar affecting the Andaman and Nicobar Islands on 24 November

Lehar made its first landfall south of Port Blair, Andaman and Nicobar, early on 25 November. However, it maintained strength. The cyclone strengthened further and developed strong radial outflow, compensating the moderate vertical wind shear in the region. Following this development, the IMD upgraded Lehar to a Severe Cyclonic Storm. The JTWC also upgraded the system to a Category 1 Tropical Cyclone on the SSHS with winds of over 65 knots (120 km/h; 75 mph). However, multispectral satellite imagery showed that a deep central dense overcast was obscuring the low level circulation. The JTWC had poor confidence in the storm's position and couldn't exactly locate its center. Lehar continued to track in a westerly direction just along the periphery of a subtropical ridge. Early on 26 November, the IMD upgraded Lehar to a Very Severe Cyclonic storm. Meanwhile, they have warned the coastal districts of Andhra Pradesh and Odisha of heavy rainfall and strong winds.

Under the steering influence of the subtropical ridge, Lehar continued to track in a west-northwesterly direction. The storm maintained a peak 1-minute average sustained windspeed of 75 knots (139 km/h; 86 mph). On passing over cooler waters and experiencing moderate easterly vertical wind shear, the storm started losing intensity. Though deep convection persisted along its well-define center, microwave imagery depicted drier air, restricting moist inflow along the southwestern periphery of the system. On 27 November, the convection around the storm's center started losing its structural organization. A scatterometer pass indicated the elongation of the LLCC with weakening wind field. Thereafter, Leher rapidly weakened into a Depression and made landfall south of Machilipatnam, Andhra Pradesh on 28 November. Increased frictional forces led to the degeneration of the storm into a well-marked low-pressure area, while it moved inland.

== Preparations and Impact ==
=== Andaman and Nicobar Islands ===
The cyclone affected the Andaman Islands with heavy rain and gusts. It caused flooding, land slides, road blockage, uprooting of trees and damage to buildings. Over two dozen fisherman went missing, and 2000 people on Little Andaman and 1500 on Havelock Island evacuated. Mayabander and Port Blair recorded heavy rainfall of 243 mm and 213 mm respectively in 24 hours as the cyclone made landfall. Four flights originating from Chennai bound to Port Blair were cancelled due to the cyclone on 25 November while 110 km/h (68 mph) winds hit the islands.

=== Andhra Pradesh ===
Lehar making landfall over India on 28 November

The Government of Andhra Pradesh had arranged four military choppers while the National Disaster Response Force (NDRF) deployed 15 teams across the state while another 15 were being arranged for rescue and relief operations immediately after the storm. The four choppers were kept at Visakhapatnam. The state's chief minister Nallari Kiran Kumar Reddy told the district collectors of Visakhapatnam, Srikakulam, Vizianagaram and East Godavari districts to evacuate all the people living in low-lying areas to higher ground. Local state health officials were warned of a potential outbreak of diseases due to extremely heavy rainfall brought by the storm. On 27 November, the state government started evacuations across East Godavari, West Godavari, Krishna and Guntur districts. About 45,000 people were evacuated in total from the districts of Guntur, Krishna, East Godavari and West Godavari. Because the storm rapidly weakened into a minimal depression before landfall, no fatalities or significant damage to property due to cyclone-related events were reported.

=== Odisha ===
The Government of Odisha asked all fishermen to return to the coast and then evacuate to safer places on 25 November. The director of the Bhubaneswar Meteorological Centre asked the ports of Paradip and Gopalpur to hoist danger signals in preparation for the storm.

== See also ==
- Cyclone Helen
- Cyclone Vardah
- Cyclone Nilam
- Cyclone Jal
- Cyclone Phailin
