= 2013 Pacific typhoon season =

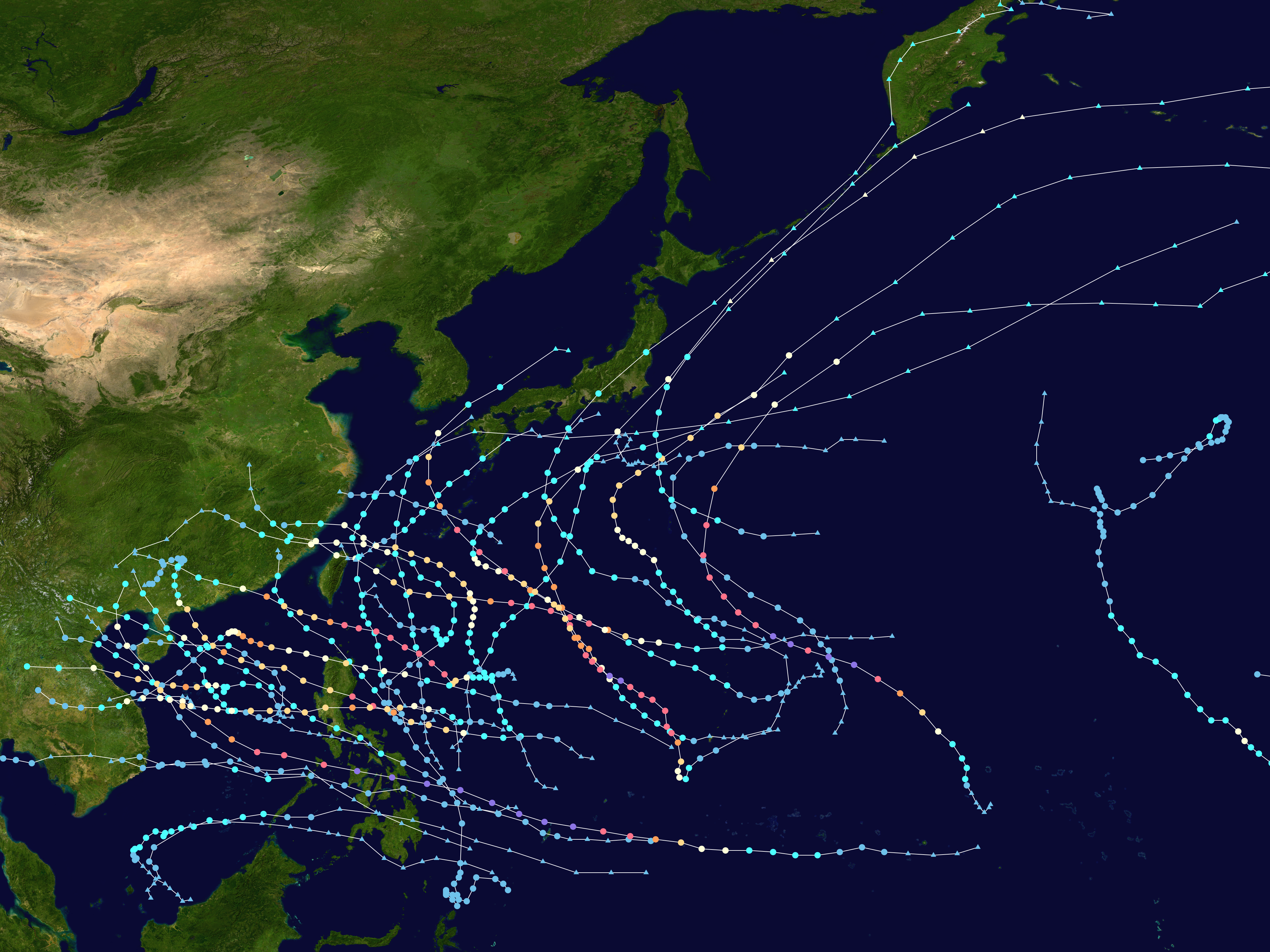
- Season summary map

Seasonal boundaries
- First system formed: January 1, 2013
- Last system dissipated: December 4, 2013

Strongest storm
- Name: Haiyan
  - Maximum winds: 230 km/h (145 mph) (10-minute sustained)
  - Lowest pressure: 895 hPa (mbar)

Seasonal statistics
- Total depressions: 48 official, 1 unofficial
- Total storms: 31
- Typhoons: 13
- Very strong typhoons: 8
- Violent typhoons: 5
- ACE: 276.3 units
- Total fatalities: 6,829 total
- Total damage: $26.45 billion (2013 USD) (Fifth-costliest Pacific typhoon season season on record)

Related articles
- Effects of the 2013 Pacific typhoon season in the Philippines; Timeline of the 2013 Pacific typhoon season; 2013 Atlantic hurricane season; 2013 Pacific hurricane season; 2013 North Indian Ocean cyclone season

The 2013 Pacific typhoon season was a record-breaking and catastrophic season that was the most active since 1994, and the deadliest since 1975. It featured 31 named storms, 13 typhoons, and five super typhoons. The season's first named storm, Sonamu, developed on January 4 while the season's last named storm, Podul, dissipated on November 15. The season ran throughout 2013, though most tropical cyclones typically develop between June and November. Collectively, the storms caused 6,829 fatalities, while total damage amounted to at least $26.41 billion (USD).

In mid-July, Typhoon Soulik in July was the strongest tropical cyclone to affect Taiwan in 2013. In mid-August, Typhoon Utor cost US$3.55 billion worth of damage and killed 97 people, after carving a path of destruction across China and the Philippines. In mid-September, Typhoon Usagi struck China's Guangdong province and caused at least $4 billion in total damage. Two weeks later, Typhoon Fitow struck China's Fujian province and wrought over $10 billion worth of damage in total, making it, at that time, China's costliest storm in history.

The season's most powerful and deadliest storm was Typhoon Haiyan. Making landfall in the Philippines as a Category 5 super typhoon in early November, it wrought catastrophic damage and devastation across the country, particularly in the islands of Samar and Leyte, where extensive loss of life was recorded. With over 6,300 fatalities, Haiyan is the ninth-deadliest Pacific typhoon on record and the deadliest in Philippine history.

The scope of this article is limited to the Pacific Ocean to the north of the equator between 100°E and the 180th meridian. Within the northwestern Pacific Ocean, there are two separate agencies that assign names to tropical cyclones, which often results in a storm having two names. The Japan Meteorological Agency (JMA) will name a tropical cyclone should it be judged to have 10-minute sustained wind speeds of at least 65 km/h (40 mph) anywhere in the basin, whilst the Philippine Atmospheric, Geophysical and Astronomical Services Administration (PAGASA) assigns names to tropical cyclones which move into or form as tropical depressions in their area of responsibility, located between 115°E and 135°E and between 5°N and 25°N, regardless of whether or not the tropical cyclone has already been given a name by the JMA. Tropical depressions monitored by the United States' Joint Typhoon Warning Center (JTWC) are given a number with a "W" suffix.

== Seasonal forecasts ==
TSR forecasts Date	Tropical storms	Total Typhoons	Intense TCs	ACE	Ref
Average (1965–2012)	26.1	16.3	8.5	295	
May 7, 2013	25.6	16.0	8.9	311	
July 8, 2013	25.4	15.8	8.4	294	
August 6, 2013	22.3	13.2	6.6	230	
Other forecasts Date	Forecast Center	Period		Systems	Ref
January 2013	PAGASA	January — March		2–3 tropical cyclones	
January 2013	PAGASA	April — June		2–4 tropical cyclones	
June 30, 2013	CWB	January 1 — December 31		23–27 tropical storms	
July 10, 2013	PAGASA	July — September		8–11 tropical cyclones	
July 10, 2013	PAGASA	October — December		5–8 tropical cyclones	
	Forecast Center	Tropical cyclones	Tropical storms	Typhoons	Ref
Actual activity:	JMA	48	31	13	
Actual activity:	JTWC	34	28	16	
Actual activity:	PAGASA	25	20	11	

During each season, several national meteorological services and scientific agencies forecast how many tropical cyclones, tropical storms, and typhoons will form during a season and/or how many tropical cyclones will affect a particular country. These agencies include the Tropical Storm Risk (TSR) Consortium of the University College London, Philippine Atmospheric, Geophysical and Astronomical Services Administration (PAGASA) and the Vietnamese National Center for Hydro Meteorological forecasts (VNCHMF).

In early December 2012, the VNCHMF noted that a tropical depression or a tropical storm could form within December or January and affect Southern Vietnam. Within its January — June seasonal climate outlook, PAGASA predicted that two to three tropical cyclones were likely to develop and/or enter the Philippine area of responsibility between January and March while two to four were predicted for the April to June period. On March 3, the VNCHMF predicted that there would be 11–13 tropical cyclones over the South China Sea during the season, with 5-6 directly affecting Vietnam. Later that month the Hong Kong Observatory, predicted that the typhoon season in Hong Kong would be near normal with four to seven tropical cyclones passing within 500 km (310 mi) of the territory compared to an average of 6. In late April, the China Meteorological Administration's Shanghai Typhoon Institute (CMA-STI) predicted that between 22 and 25 tropical storms would develop within the basin during the year, while the Thai Meteorological Department (TMD) predicted that at least two tropical storms would move towards Thailand during 2013. The first of the two tropical storms was predicted to pass near Upper Thailand in either August or September, while the other one was expected to move to the south of Southern Thailand during October or November. On May 7, the TSR Consortium released their first forecast of the season and predicted that the basin would see a near average season with 25.6 tropical storms, 16 typhoons, 8.9 "intense" typhoons and an ACE index of about 311 units. (Note: According to the TSR, an intense tropical cyclone is a tropical cyclone with maximum 1-minute sustained winds greater than 175 km/h (110 mph).)

In late June after a slow start to the season Taiwan's Central Weather Bureau predicted that the season, would be near average of 25.7 with 23–27 tropical storms occurring over the basin during 2013. Between two and four of the systems were also predicted to affect Taiwan compared to an average of around 3.6. Within its July forecast update TSR noted that despite the slow start to the season, they continued to anticipate either near or slightly above-normal activity for the remainder of 2013; however, the ACE index was reduced slightly to 294 units. During July, PAGASA predicted that between eight and eleven tropical cyclones were likely to develop and/or enter the Philippine area of responsibility between July and September while five to eight were predicted to occur between October and December. Later in the month the VNCHMF, predicted that nine to ten tropical cyclones would be observed within the South China Sea, during the rest of the year. They also predicted that four to five tropical cyclones would directly affect Vietnam, while the CMA-STI predicted that between 22 and 25 tropical storms would develop or move into the basin during the year. On August 6, TSR released their August update and significantly lowered their forecast to 22.3 tropical storms, 13.2 typhoons, 6.6 "intense" typhoons and an ACE index of about 230, which they noted would result in activity about 20% below their 1965–2012 average. This was because the season was running about 60% below the expected year-to-date activity and only one to two typhoons had developed by the end of July. During October 2013, the VNCHMF predicted that one to two tropical cyclones would develop and possibly affect Vietnam between November 2013 and April 2014.

== Season summary ==
Costliest known Pacific typhoon seasons
Rank	Total damages	Season
1	$38.54 billion	2019
2	$38.06 billion	2023
3	$30.59 billion	2018
4	$29.62 billion	2024
5	$26.45 billion	2013
6	$21.05 billion	2012
7	$18.77 billion	2004
8	$17.44 billion	1991
9	$17.18 billion	2000
10	$16.96 billion	2016

The first two-thirds of the season were very weak, with only two typhoons forming despite the average amount of named storms forming. However, the season became dramatically active since mid-September. The last fourteen named storms formed within approximately two months, yet only three of them were below the typhoon strength. Initially, Typhoon Man-yi made landfall over Japan. Tropical Depression 18W, known in Vietnam as Tropical Storm No.8, flooding triggered by the storm in Vietnam, Laos and Thailand damaged nearly US$80 million and 23 deaths. Typhoon Usagi made landfall over Guangdong, China and cost US$4.6 billion in the country, which was the third strongest storm of the basin in 2013. Later, Typhoon Wutip made landfall over Vietnam. In early October, Typhoon Fitow made landfall over Fujian, China and caused over US$10 billion damage, becoming the costliest tropical cyclone in 2013. Typhoon Danas affected Japan and South Korea, but without significant damage.

Typhoon Nari brought significant damage over the Philippines and eventually made landfall over Vietnam, as well as Typhoon Wipha which killed 41 people in Japan. Typhoons Francisco and Lekima did not directly affect any country, but they were both violent typhoons, especially the latter one becoming the second strongest of this basin in 2013. Typhoon Krosa crossed northern Luzon on October 31 and intensified further, although it dissipated in the South China Sea. In early November, Tropical Depression Wilma formed over the Caroline Islands, moved out of the basin, and ultimately arrived in the Arabian Sea in mid-November.

At the same time in early November, Typhoon Haiyan initially affected Palau significantly. The typhoon later became one of the most intense tropical cyclones on record and immediately made landfall over the Philippines. After arriving at the South China Sea, Haiyan made landfall over Vietnam and also impact Guangxi and Hainan provinces of China. Typhoon Haiyan, also known as Typhoon Yolanda, caused 6,300 fatalities and over US$2 billion damage in the Philippines, becoming the deadliest and costliest typhoon in modern Philippine history.

== Systems ==
=== Severe Tropical Storm Sonamu (Auring) ===
- Severe tropical storm (JMA)
- Tropical storm (SSHWS)
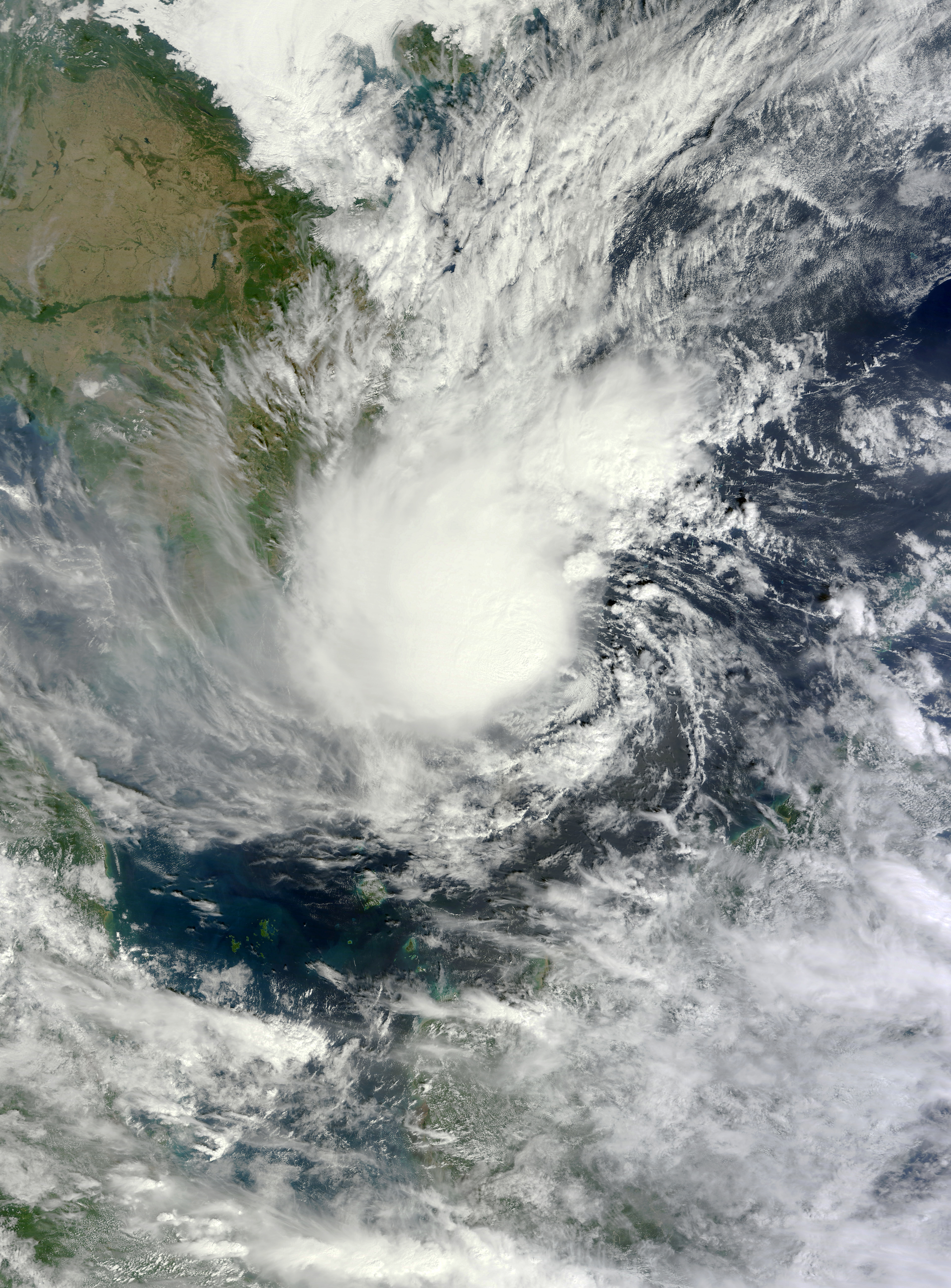
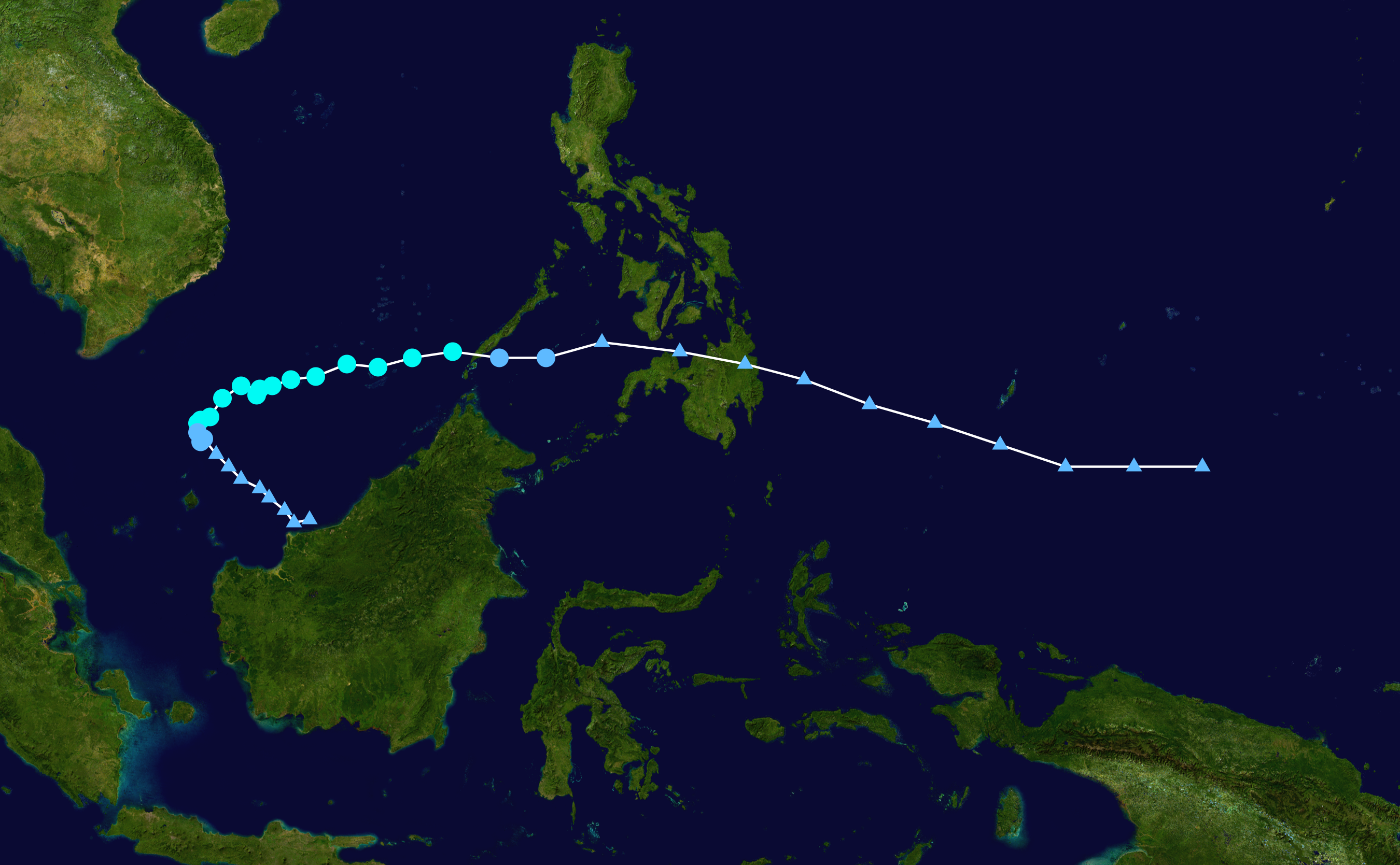
- Duration: January 1 – January 10
- Peak intensity: 95 km/h (60 mph) (10-min); 990 hPa (mbar)

Early on January 1, a tropical depression developed about 1,090 km (675 mi) southwest of Guam. Over the next couple of days, the depression moved northwestward and gradually developed in an area of moderate windshear. Late on January 2, the center passed over the Philippine island of Mindanao but maintained its deep convective banding, which prompted the JTWC to issue a Tropical Cyclone Formation Alert (TCFA). During the next day, PAGASA named the depression Auring. The system moved westwards into the Sulu Sea, and the JTWC initiated advisories on the system as 01W. The JMA reported later that day that the depression intensified into Tropical Storm Sonamu, before the JTWC followed suit early on January 4 as the system continued to consolidate. After further strengthening, Sonamu intensified into a severe tropical storm on January 5, with 10-minute sustained winds of 95 km/h (60 mph). Early on January 8, the JMA and JTWC reported that Sonamu weakened into a tropical depression. The system dissipated on January 10 about 110 km (70 mi) west of Bintulu in Sarawak.

Within the Philippines, 1 person drowned while another person died after being hit by a coconut tree. A passenger ship was stranded near the coast of Dumaguete City on January 3 before being rescued.

The name Sonamu was retired and replaced by Jongdari which was first used in the 2018 season. The reason is that it's sound similar to tsunami, which trigger fear in Malaysia.

=== Tropical Depression Bising ===
- Tropical depression (JMA)
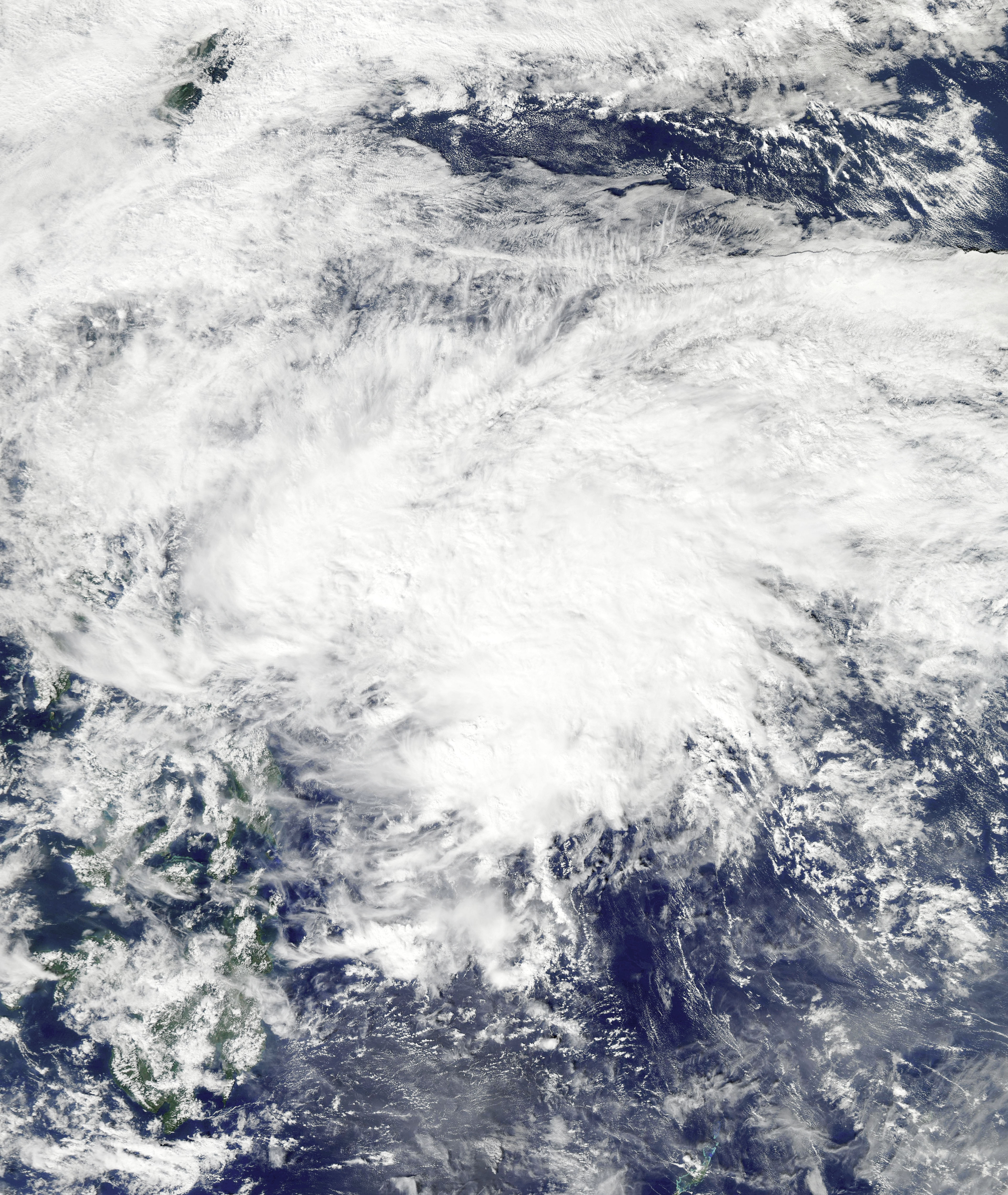
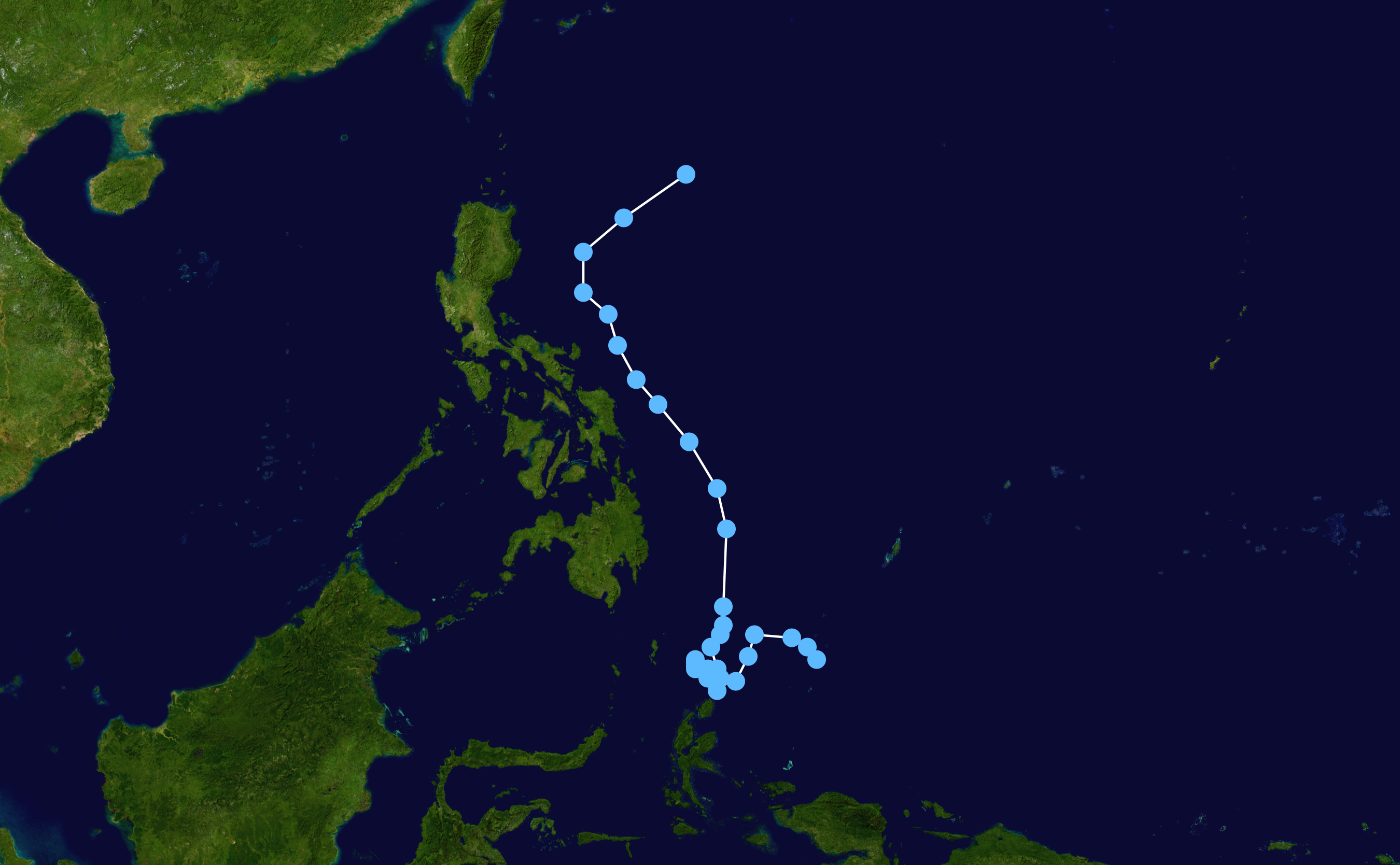
- Duration: January 6 – January 13
- Peak intensity: 55 km/h (35 mph) (10-min); 1002 hPa (mbar)

Early on January 6, the JMA started to monitor a tropical depression that had developed, about 480 km (300 mi) to the southeast of Melekeok, Palau. Over the next few days the JMA continued to monitor the system as a tropical depression, before PAGASA named it Bising during January 11. Over the next few days the system moved towards the north-northeast, before it was last noted during January 13, as it weakened into an area of low pressure.

Bising caused moderate to heavy rains across Bicol Region, Eastern Visayas, Central Visayas and Mindanao. A school laboratory in Lanuza was damaged, and the loss were amounted to Php1.5 million (US$37,000).

=== Tropical Storm Shanshan (Crising) ===
- Tropical storm (JMA)
- Tropical depression (SSHWS)
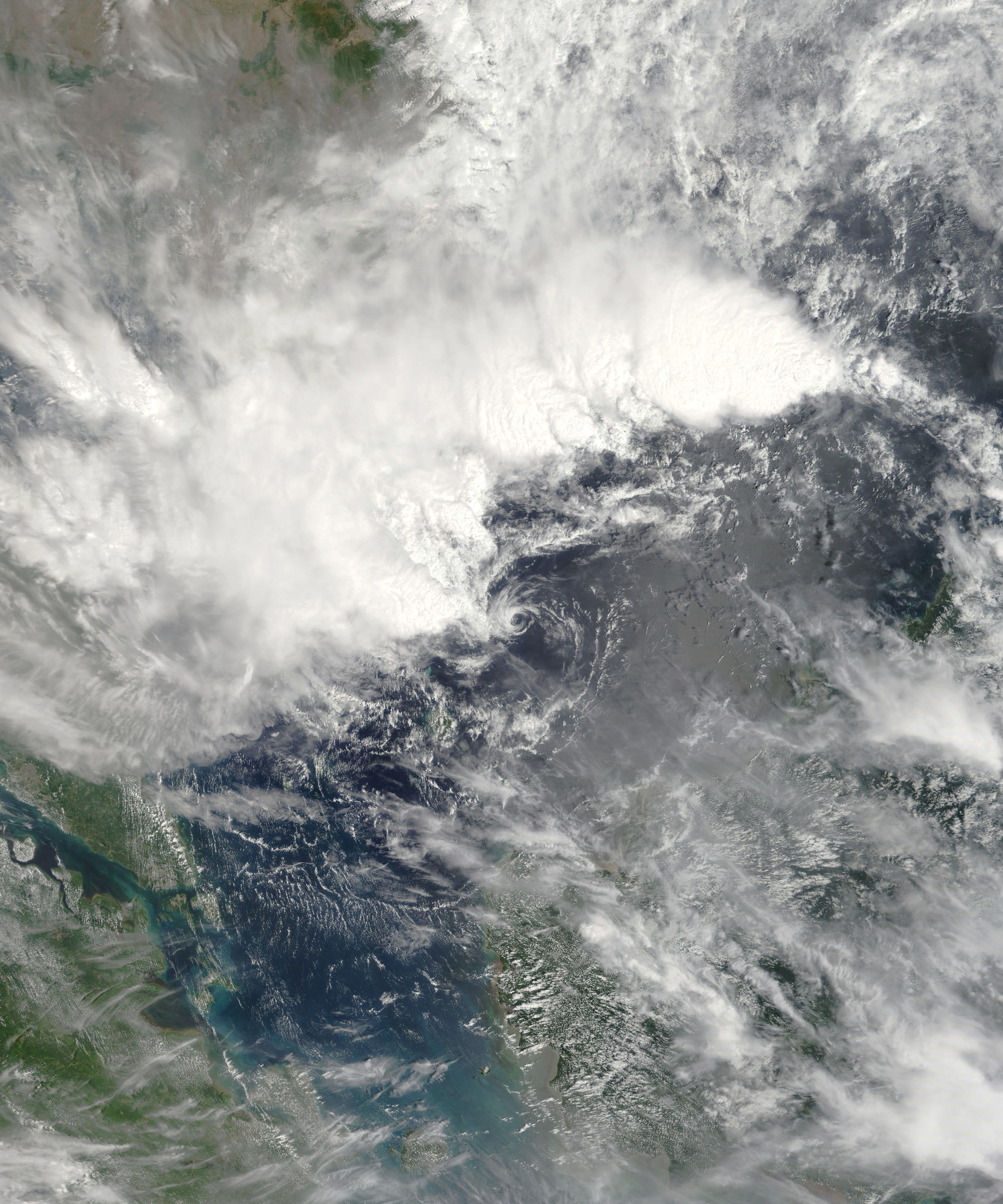
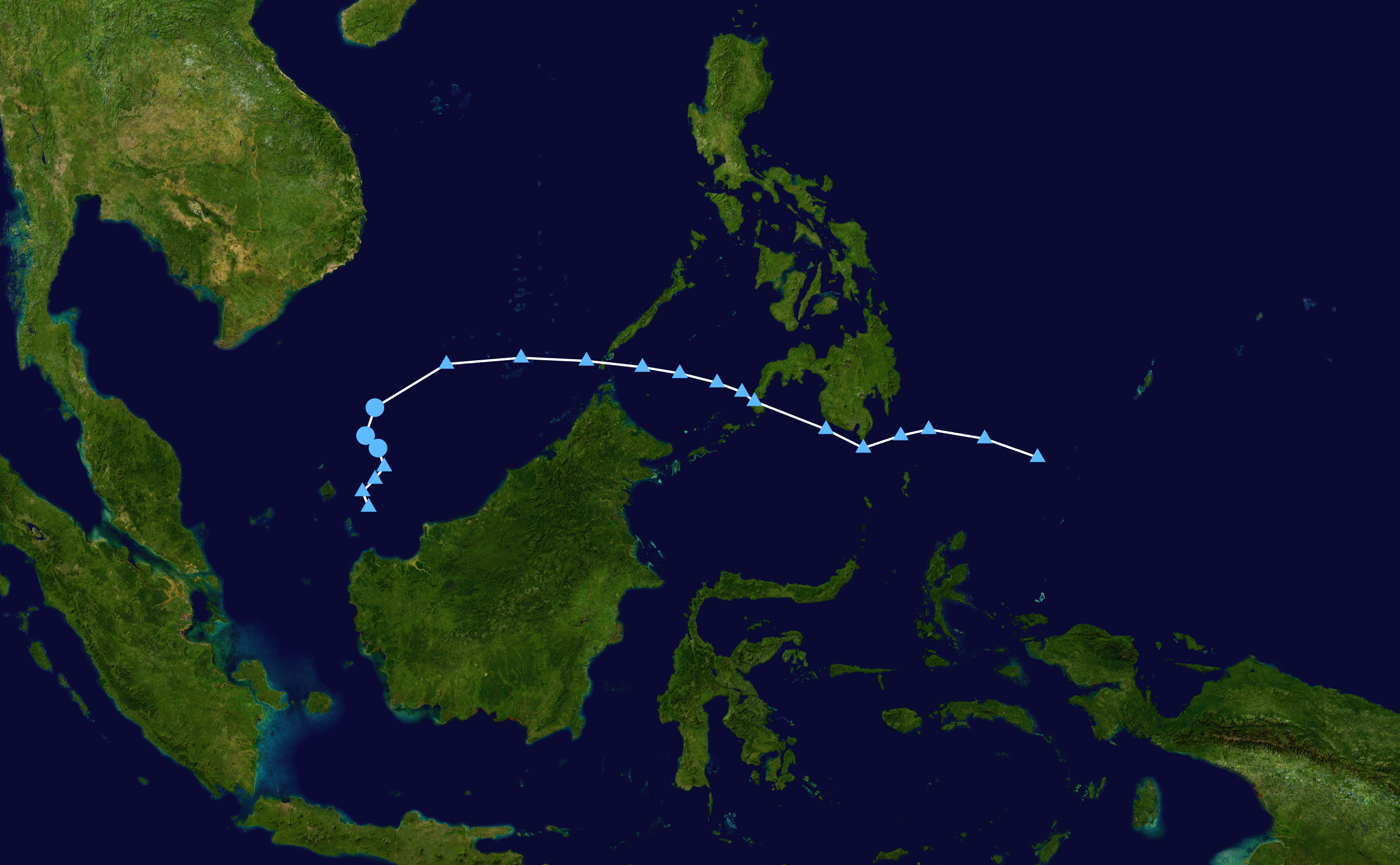
- Duration: February 18 – February 23
- Peak intensity: 65 km/h (40 mph) (10-min); 1002 hPa (mbar)

On February 18, a tropical depression formed about 650 km (405 mi) east of southern Mindanao, with PAGASA naming it Crising. With low to moderate wind shear, the depression developed further. On February 19, the JTWC initiated warnings on Tropical Depression 02W, but discontinued advisories two days later after the circulation became poorly defined and convection was sheared. However, the JMA reported that the depression intensified into Tropical Storm Shanshan on February 21. The next day, Shanshan weakened into a tropical depression before dissipating east of Natuna Islands.

Heavy rains from the storm triggered flooding in the southern Philippines that killed eleven people and left two others missing. The storm damaged 1,346 houses, while crop damage estimated to be ₱11.2 million (US$275,000). On February 20, classes in three cities in Cebu were suspended due to heavy rains.

=== Tropical Storm Yagi (Dante) ===
- Tropical storm (JMA)
- Tropical storm (SSHWS)
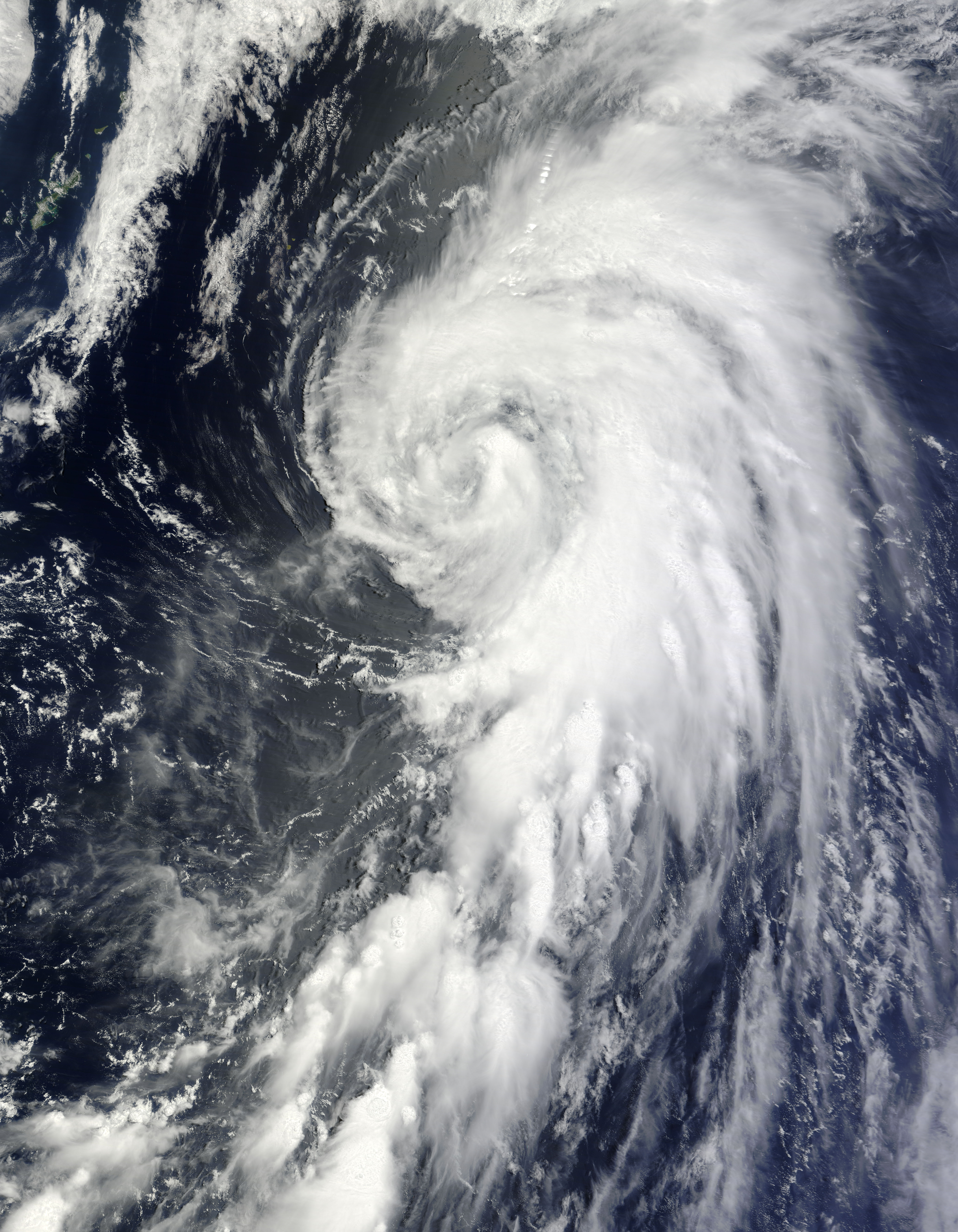
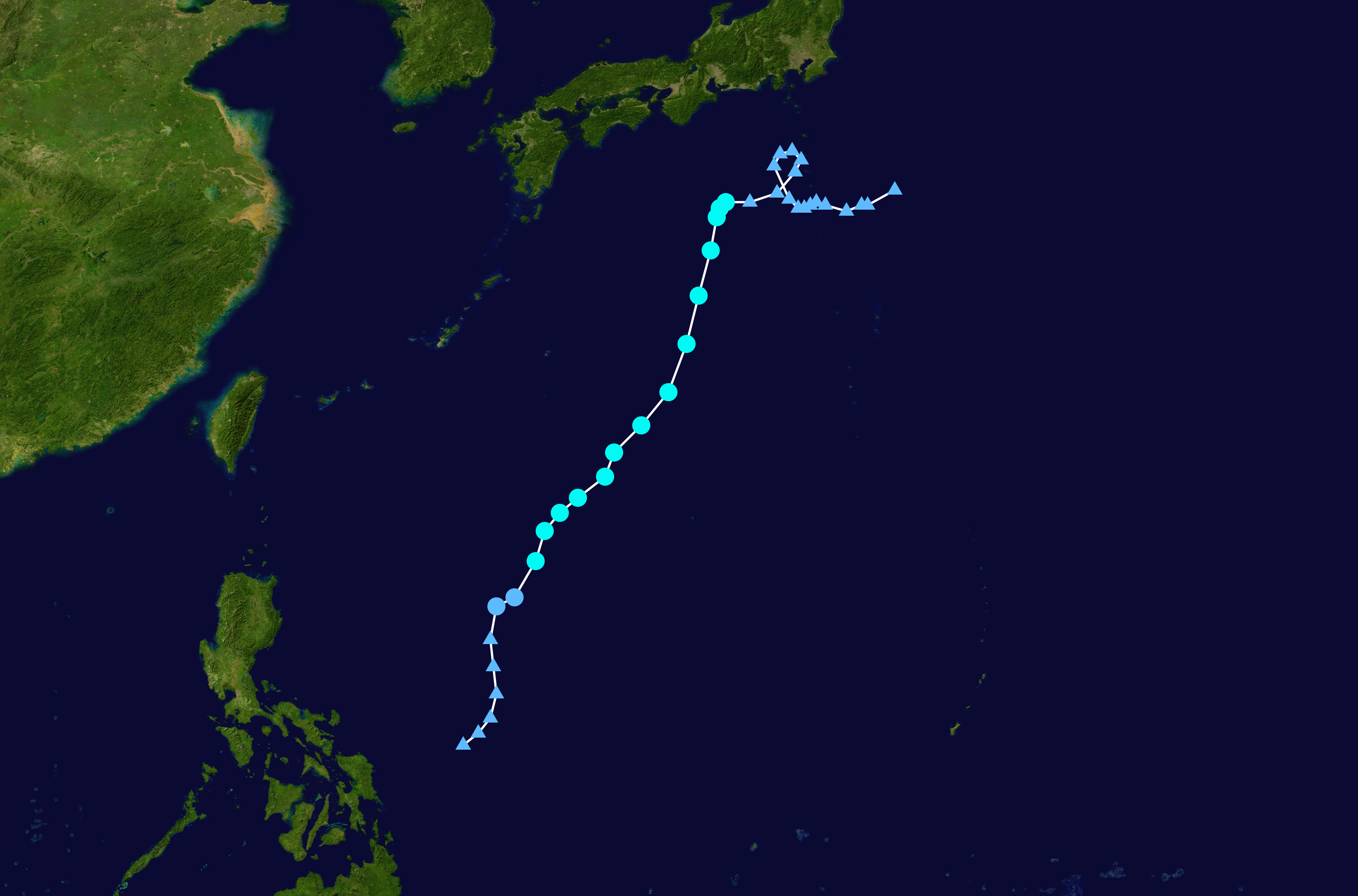
- Duration: June 6 – June 12
- Peak intensity: 85 km/h (50 mph) (10-min); 990 hPa (mbar)

On June 6, a tropical depression formed southeast of the Philippines within an area of moderate wind shear. Located along the western edge of the subtropical ridge, the system gradually intensified while moving to the northeast, aided by strong divergence. On June 7, PAGASA named the system Dante, and the next day the JMA upgraded the depression to Tropical Storm Yagi. Later, the JTWC initiated advisories and quickly upgraded to tropical storm status after the system consolidated. Slow strengthening continued, and Yagi peaked with winds of 85 km/h (55 mph) on June 10. However, the storm was soon impacted by northwesterly wind shear, causing the system to become disorganized and weaken in intensity. Early on June 12, Yagi became extratropical to the south of Japan, and four days later it dissipated about 1,600 km (995 mi) southeast of Tokyo, Japan.

After Yagi had enhanced the southwest monsoon which brought heavy rain to parts of the Philippines, PAGASA declared that the rainy season had begun on June 10, 2013. Yagi also brought some rain to parts of Japan, including the island of Honshu.

=== Tropical Storm Leepi (Emong) ===
- Tropical storm (JMA)
- Tropical storm (SSHWS)
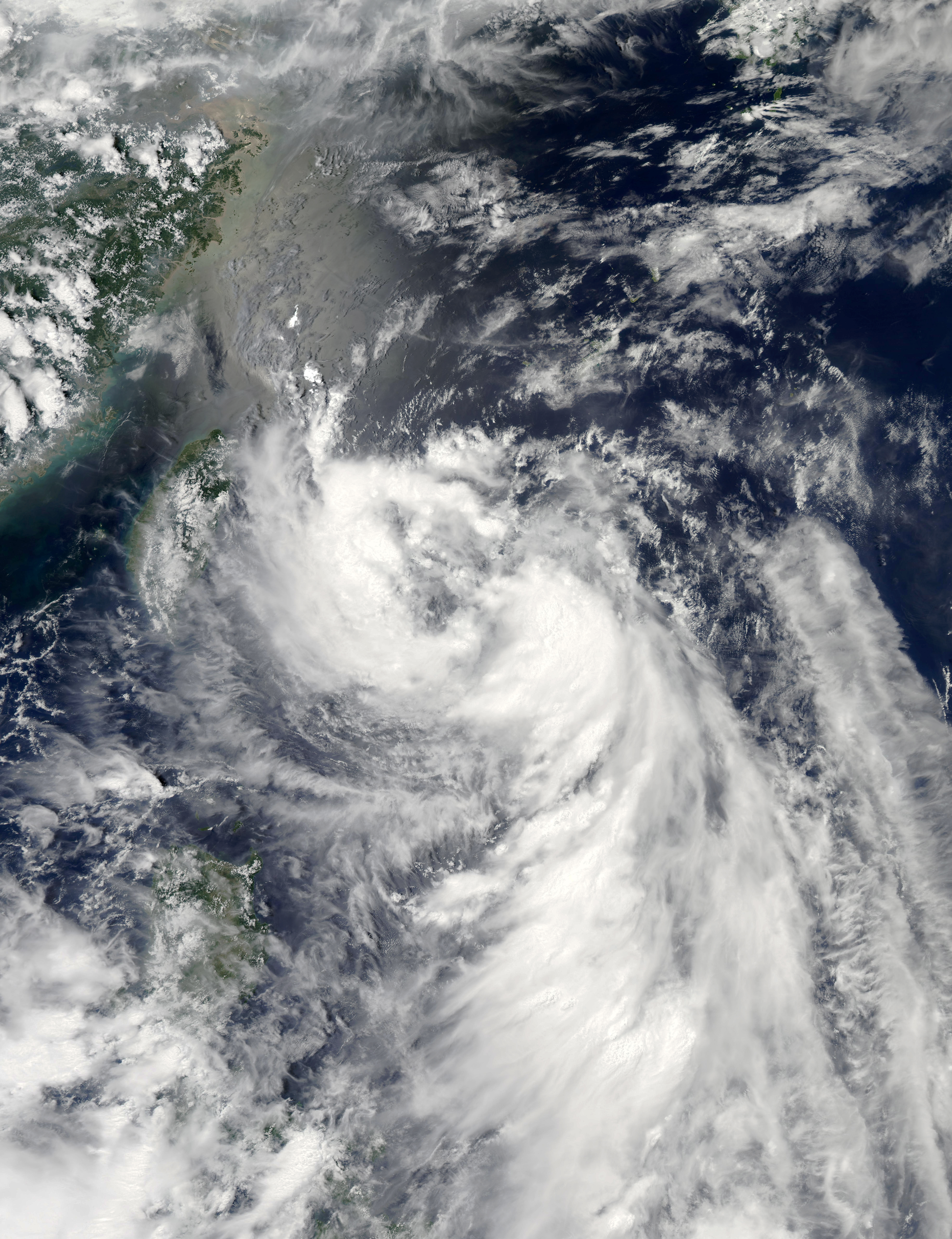
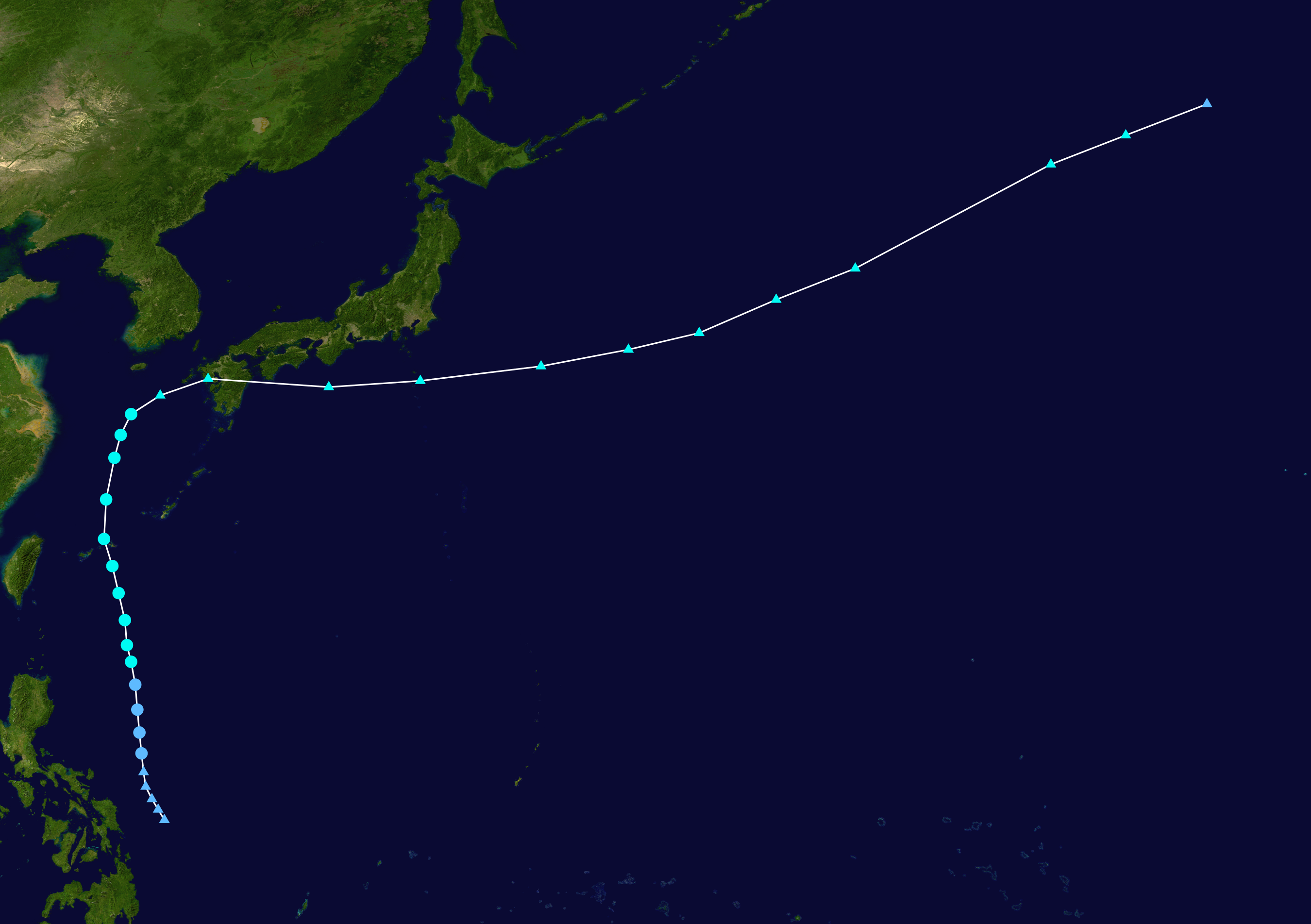
- Duration: June 16 – June 21
- Peak intensity: 75 km/h (45 mph) (10-min); 994 hPa (mbar)

Early on June 16, a tropical depression formed southeast of the Philippines, which PAGASA named Emong. Late on June 17, the JTWC initiated advisories on Tropical Depression 04W. The next day, the JMA upgraded the depression to Tropical Storm Leepi on June 18 after further organization and a general northward movement. Interaction with a tropical upper tropospheric trough (TUTT) cell to the east of Leepi sheared the convection to the southwest of the center, which consisted of several smaller circulations. Based on this occurrence, the JTWC downgraded the system to tropical depression intensity early on June 20, and early the next day, the JMA declared Leepi as extratropical near southwestern Japan. The storm fully dissipated early on June 24.

Due to heavy rainfall from the precursor system, PAGASA issued a flash flood warning for parts of Mindanao. Heavy precipitation was reported in Davao City, as well as Greater Manila, where the Metropolitan Manila Development Authority offered free rides to stricken commuters. This system caused rains over parts of the Philippines including Southern Luzon, Visayas and Northern Mindanao. Later, the outer rainbands of Leepi caused downpours over eastern Taiwan. In Okinawa, sustained winds reached 55 km/h (35 mph) and gusts peaked at 87 km/h (54 mph). Despite losing much of its convection before reaching Japan, the remnants of Leepi continued to drop heavy rainfall. In Umaji, Kōchi, a station recorded 354.5 mm (13.96 in) of rain in a 24-hour period, more than half of the average June rainfall for the station.

=== Tropical Storm Bebinca (Fabian) ===
- Tropical storm (JMA)
- Tropical storm (SSHWS)
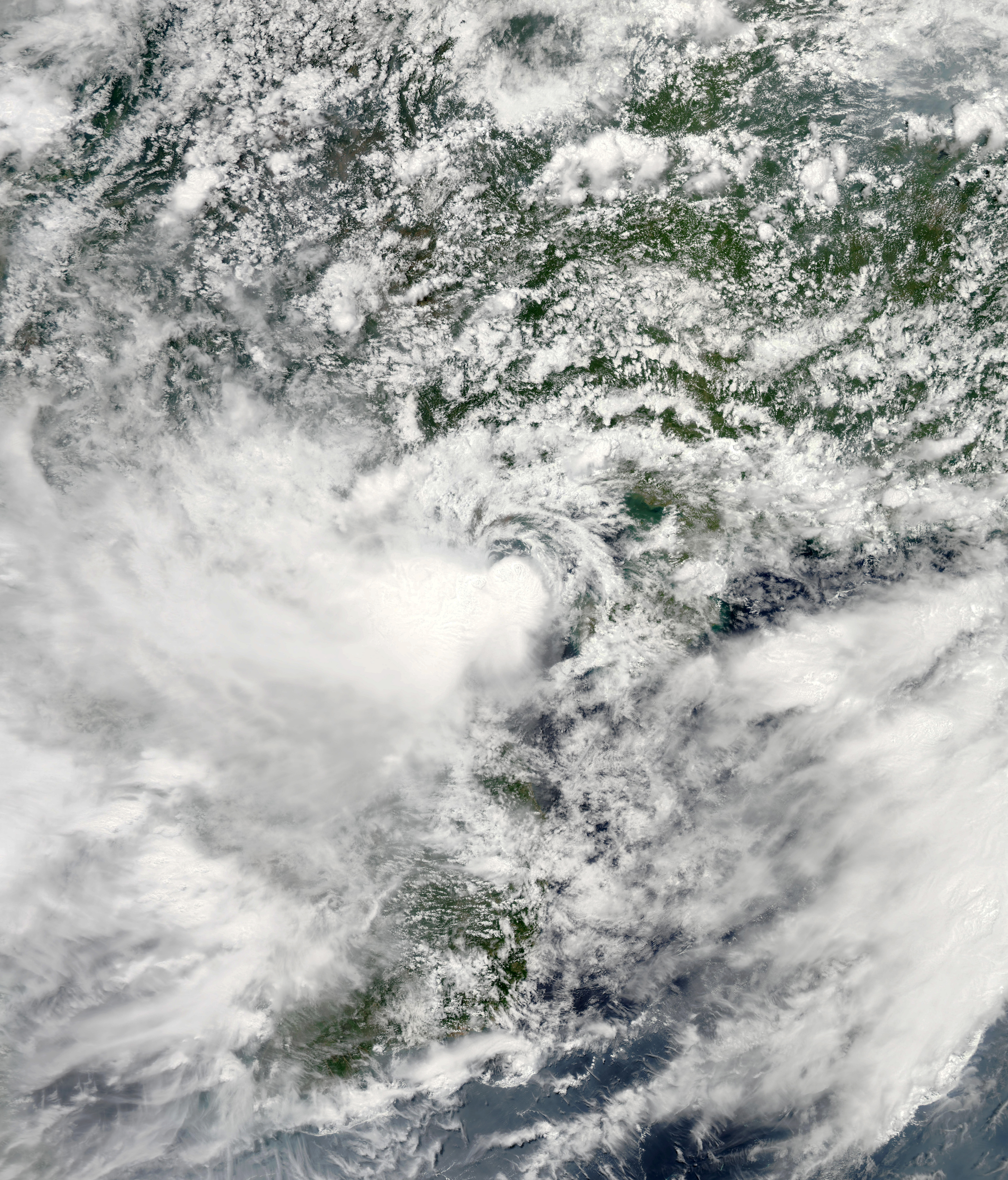
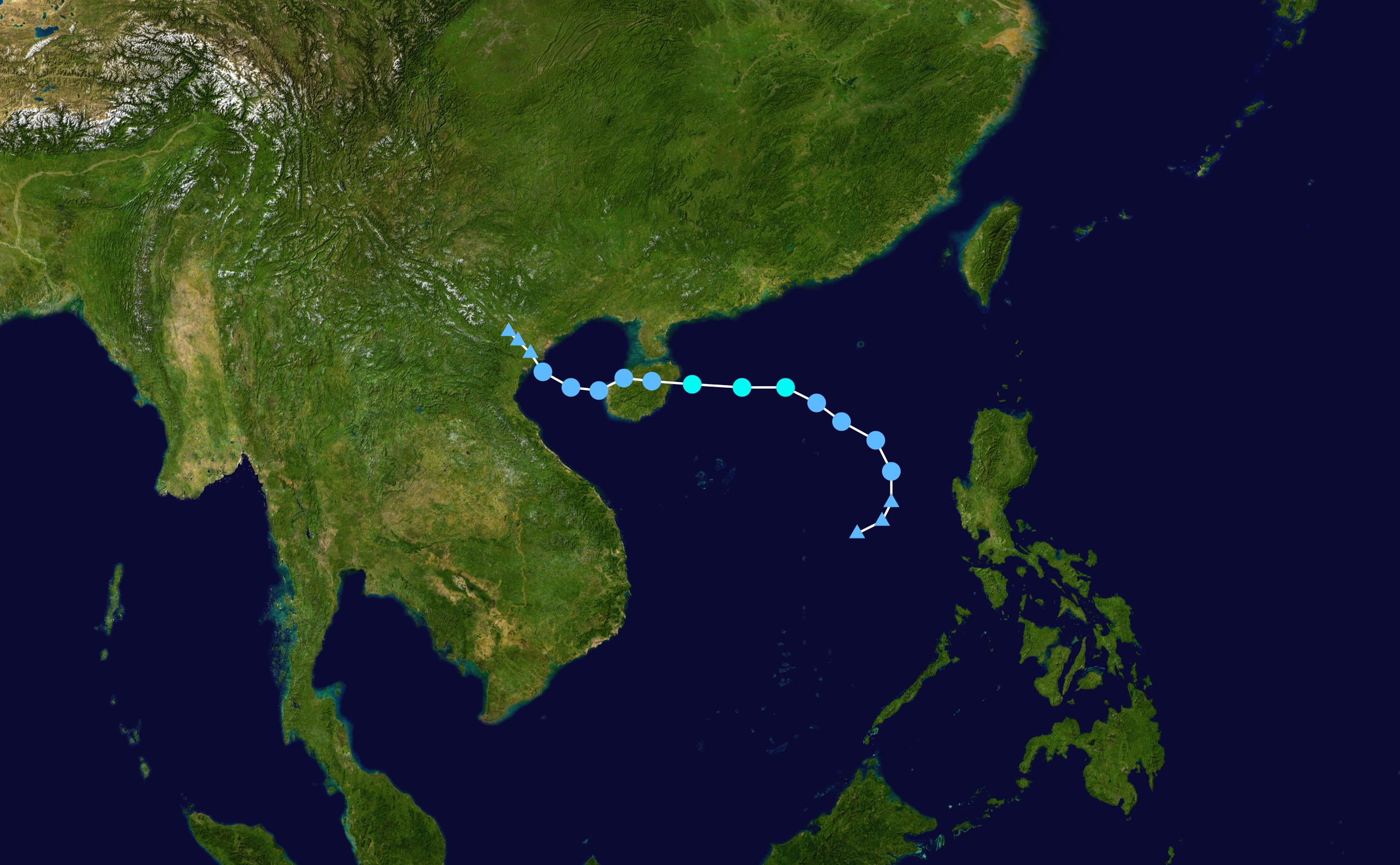
- Duration: June 19 – June 24
- Peak intensity: 75 km/h (45 mph) (10-min); 990 hPa (mbar)

In mid-June, strong but disorganized convection persisted in the South China Sea approximately 1,110 km (690 mi) south of Hong Kong. The disturbance gradually organized, and was classified as a tropical depression by the JMA at 1800 UTC on June 19; PAGASA followed suit six hours later, naming the system Fabian. Despite wind shear generated by a subtropical ridge, the depression maintained a well-defined circulation, allowing the system to intensify. At 0000 UTC on June 21, the JMA upgraded the cyclone to Tropical Storm Bebinca. Following this upgrade in strength, however, Bebinca failed to intensify further, and leveled out in intensity prior to making landfall on Hainan on June 22. Bebinca's passage weakened the system to tropical depression strength, and, despite moving over the Gulf of Tonkin, failed to restrengthen before making a final landfall on June 23 east of Hanoi.

Due to the potential effects of Bebinca, Sanya Phoenix International Airport cancelled or delayed 147 inbound and outbound flights, leaving 8,000 passengers stranded. In Beibu Bay, a fishing boat with four fishermen on board lost communication contact with the mainland, but were found the subsequent day. Rainfall in Hainan peaked at 227 mm (8.9 in) in Sanya. A total of 21.7 million people were affected, and damage amounted to ¥10 million (US$1.63 million). Heavy rains affected several provinces in northern Vietnam, peaking at 356 mm (14.0 in) in Hon Ngu, Nghệ An Province.

=== Severe Tropical Storm Rumbia (Gorio) ===
- Severe tropical storm (JMA)
- Category 1 typhoon (SSHWS)
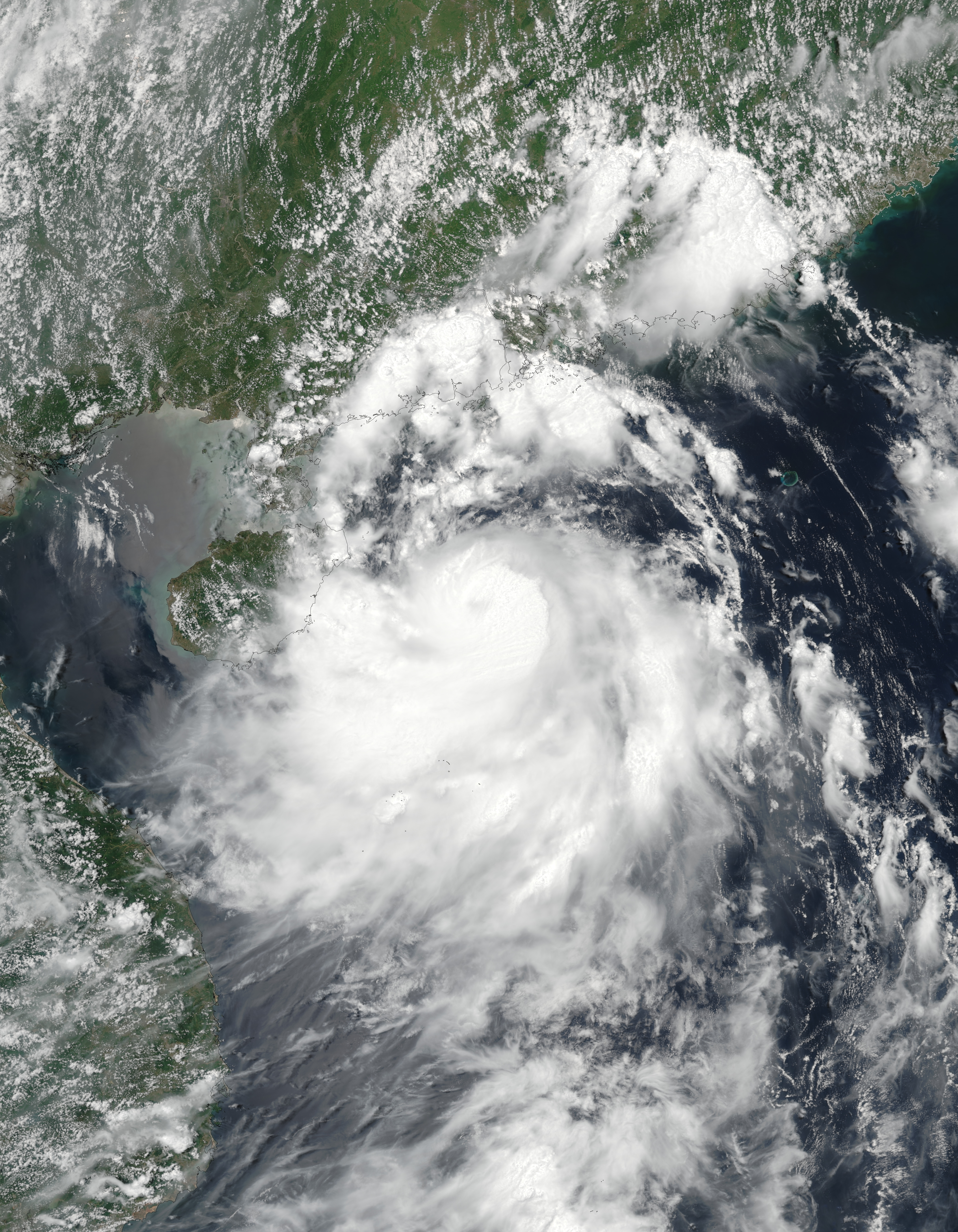
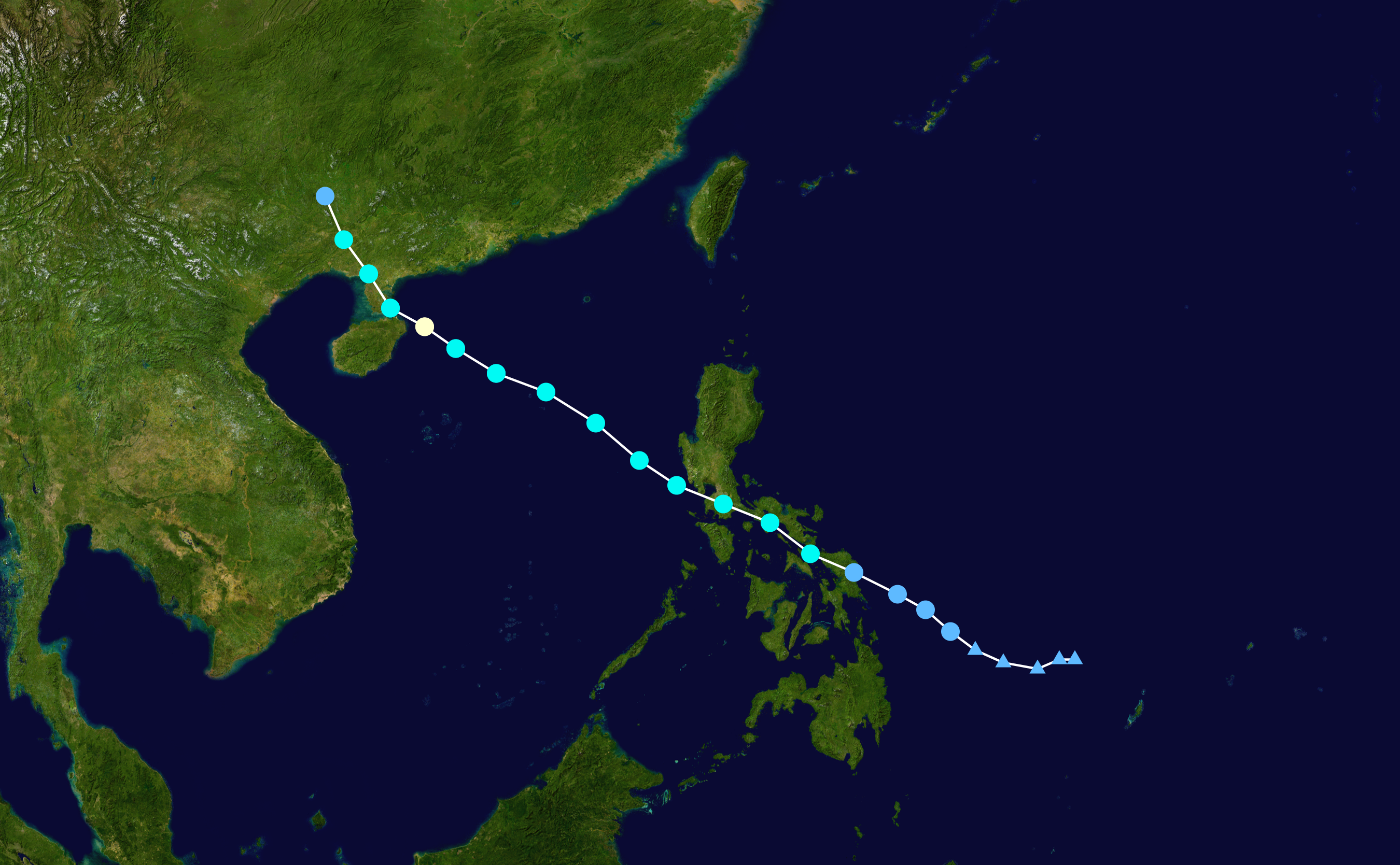
- Duration: June 27 – July 2
- Peak intensity: 95 km/h (60 mph) (10-min); 985 hPa (mbar)

In late June, a low-pressure area persisted within the ITCZ east of the Philippines. Initially tracking southward, the disturbance moved east and then recurved to the west. Steadily organizing, the disturbance became a tropical depression on June 27, moving to the northwest due to a nearby ridge. On June 28, the disturbance strengthened into Tropical Storm Rumbia, and the next day made its first landfall on Eastern Samar in the Philippines. Rumbia spent roughly a day moving across the archipelago before emerging into the South China Sea, where it resumed strengthening to a peak of 95 km/h (60 mph) on July 1, a severe tropical storm. The storm weakened slightly before moving ashore the Leizhou Peninsula in China late that day. Due to land interaction, Rumbia quickly weakened into a low-pressure area on July 2 and dissipated soon after.

Upon landfall in the Philippines, Rumbia caused extensive flooding across multiple islands, which disrupted transportation and displaced thousands of people. Power outages resulted from the heavy rain and strong winds, and seven deaths were reported within Concepción, Iloilo after an unnamed motorbanca capsized. At its landfall in China, Rumbia damaged large swaths of agricultural cropland and destroyed at least 112 buildings, causing ¥7.68 million in damage.

=== Typhoon Soulik (Huaning) ===
- Very strong typhoon (JMA)
- Category 4 typhoon (SSHWS)
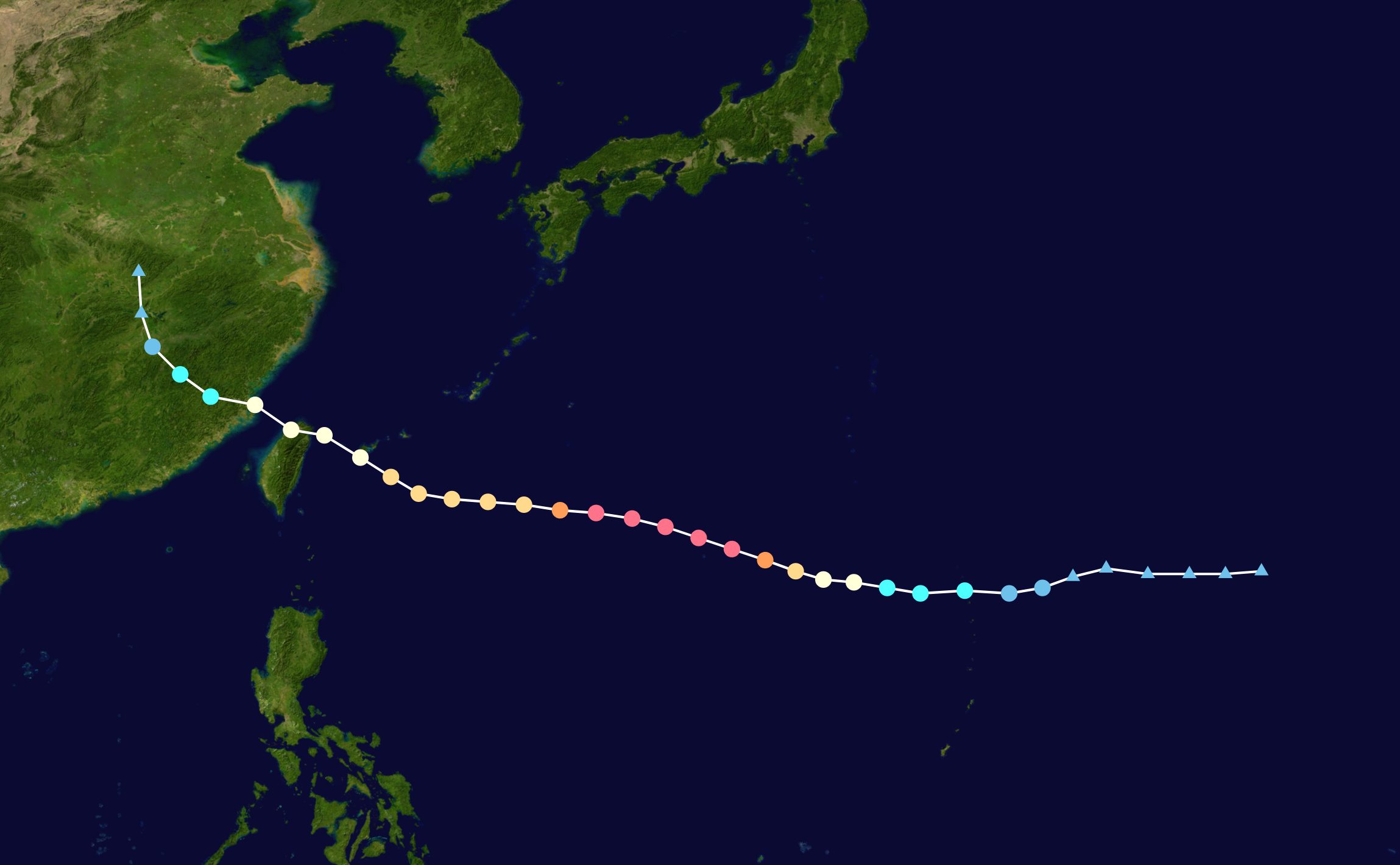
- Duration: July 7 – July 14
- Peak intensity: 185 km/h (115 mph) (10-min); 925 hPa (mbar)

In early July, an upper-level cold-core low persisted well to the northeast of Guam. Gaining tropical characteristics, the system soon developed a surface low and became Tropical Depression 07W early on July 7. Tracking generally westward, a motion it would retain for its entire existence, the depression underwent a period of rapid intensification starting on July 8 that culminated in Soulik attaining its peak strength early on July 10. At that time, the system had sustained winds estimated at 185 km/h (115 mph) and barometric pressure of 925 hPa (27.32 inHg). Thereafter, an eyewall replacement cycle and cooler waters weakened the system. Though it passed over the warm waters of the Kuroshio Current the following day, dry air soon impinged upon the typhoon. Soulik later made landfall late on July 12 in northern Taiwan before weakening in to a tropical storm. Briefly emerging over the Taiwan Strait, the storm moved onshore for a second time in Fujian on July 13. The system was last noted on July 14, as it dissipated over land.

Striking Taiwan as a strong typhoon, Soulik brought gusts up to 220 km/h (140 mph) and torrential rains. Numerous trees and power lines fell, leaving roughly 800,000 without electricity. Severe flooding prompted thousands to evacuate as well. Four people died on the island while 123 more were injured. In East China, more than 162 million people were affected by the storm. Heavy rains and typhoon-force winds caused extensive damage and killed 11 people.

=== Tropical Storm Cimaron (Isang) ===
- Tropical storm (JMA)
- Tropical storm (SSHWS)
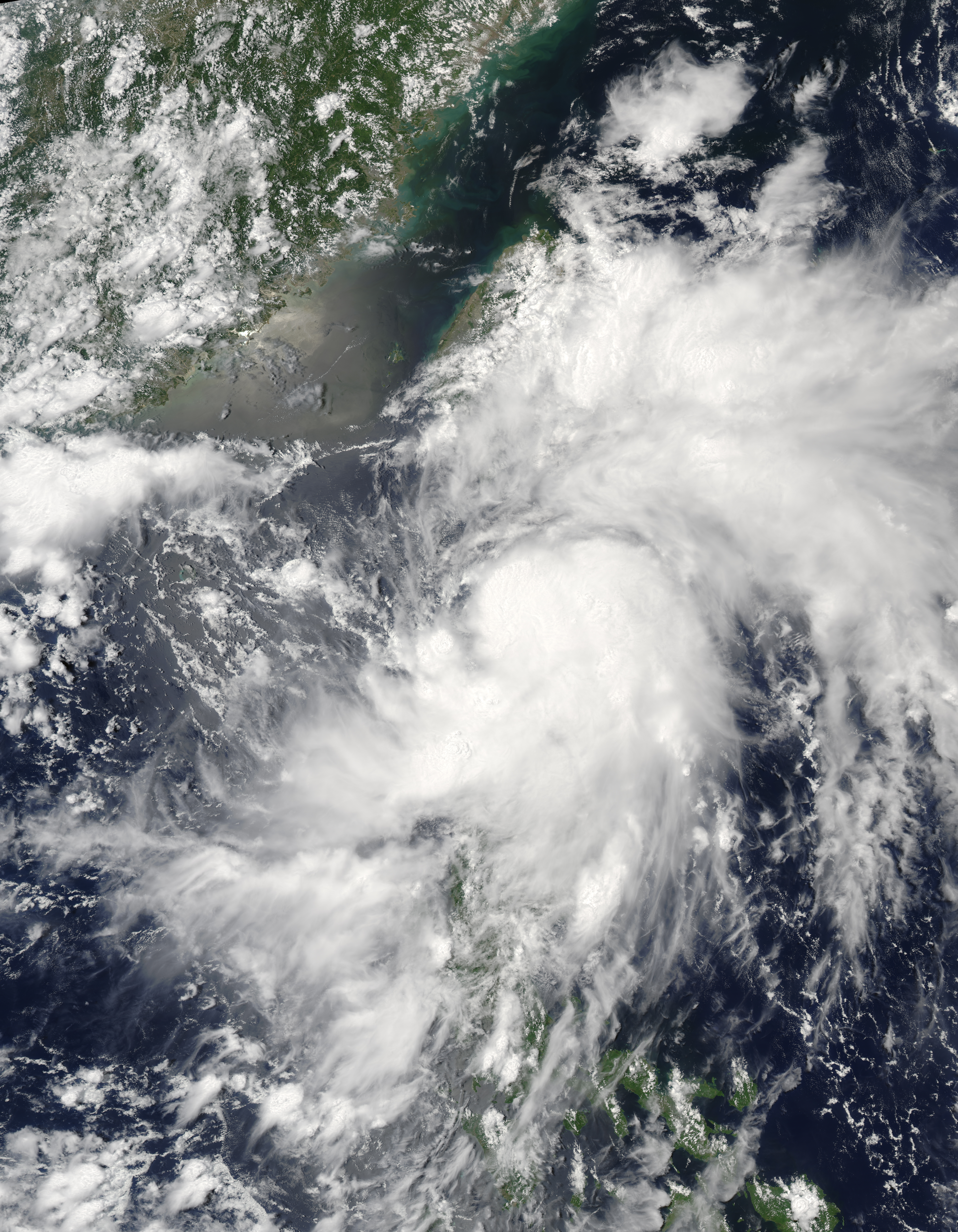
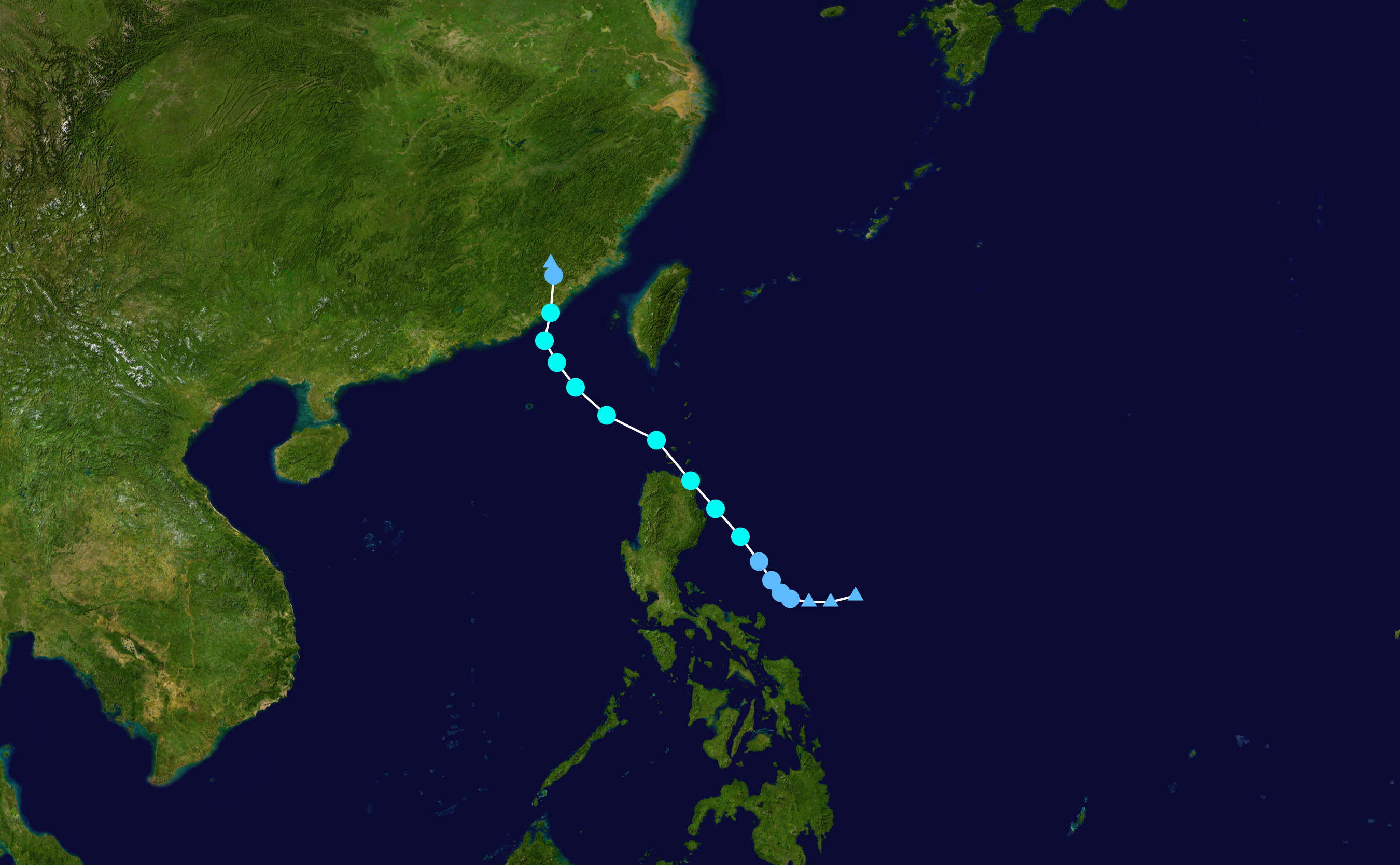
- Duration: July 15 – July 18
- Peak intensity: 75 km/h (45 mph) (10-min); 1000 hPa (mbar)

A tropical disturbance formed east of the Philippines on July 15. Later that day, it was given the name Isang by the PAGASA. Early the next day, it intensified into Tropical Storm Cimaron as it made several thunderstorms. Its remnants stayed east of Taiwan on July 19 and it finally dissipated on July 20.

On July 17, a lightning incident within the Philippine province of Ilocos Sur, left two people dead and two others injured. Torrential rains over southern Fujian Province triggered significant flooding, with areas already saturated from Typhoon Soulik less than a week prior. A 24-hour peak of 505.3 mm (19.89 in) was measured in Mei Village, with an hourly maximum of 132.3 mm (5.21 in). Many homes were inundated and several roads were washed out. Some areas experienced 1-in-500-year flooding. Approximately 20.28 million people were affected by the storm, 8.92 million of whom were temporarily relocated. At least one person was killed and another was reported missing. An unusually intense thunderstorm associated with Cimaron produced a prolific lightning event over Xiamen, with 406 strikes recorded in two hours.

=== Severe Tropical Storm Jebi (Jolina) ===
- Severe tropical storm (JMA)
- Tropical storm (SSHWS)
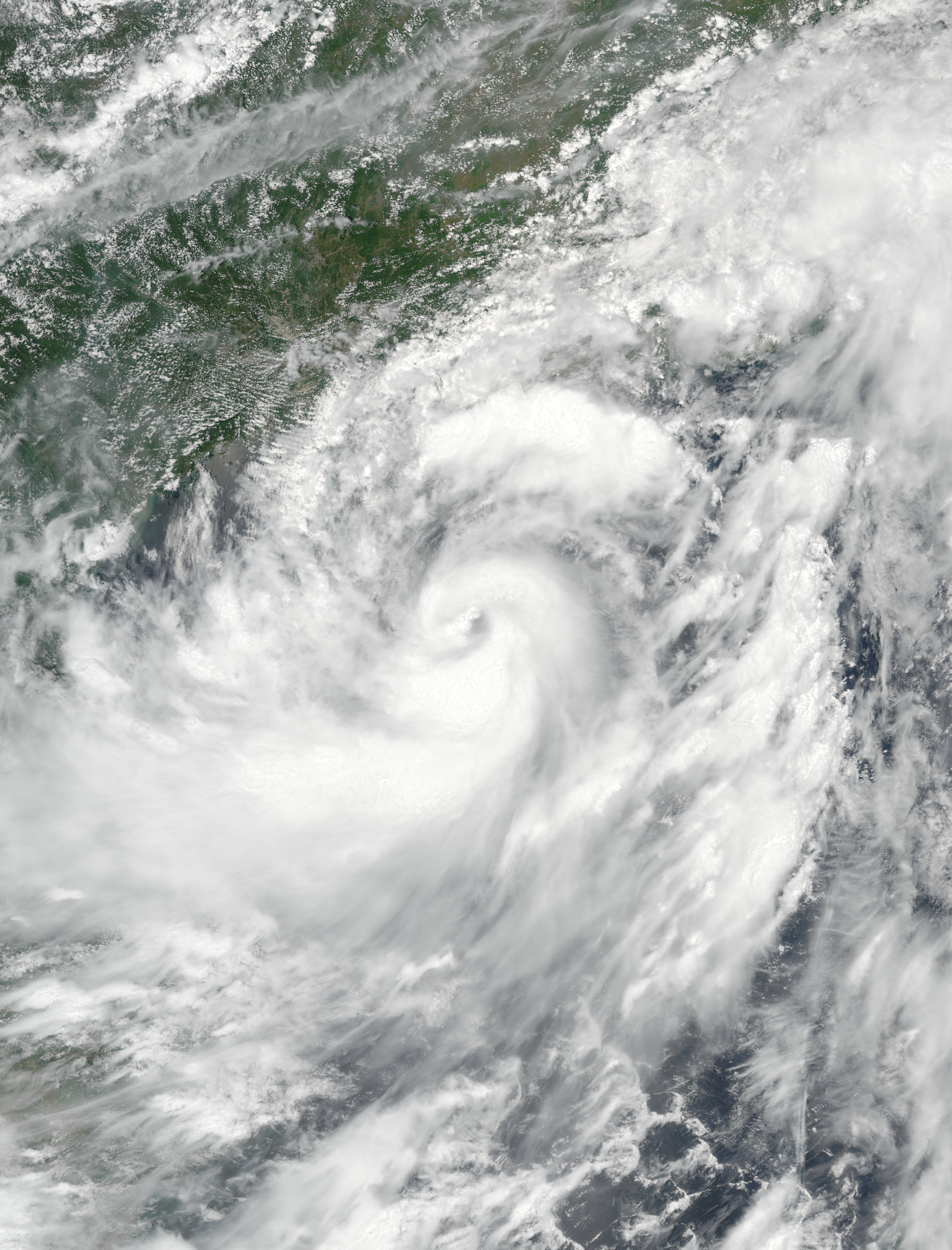
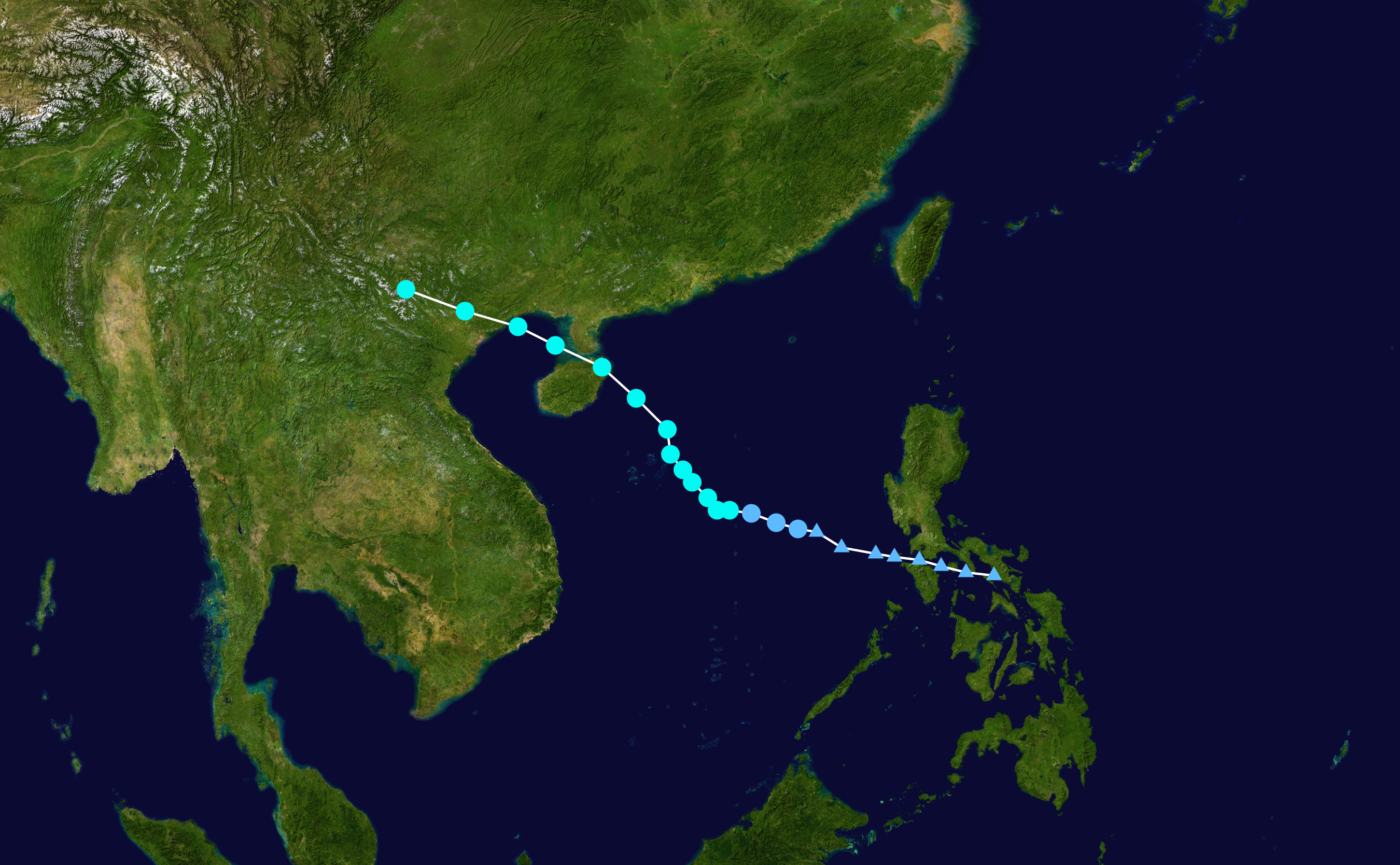
- Duration: July 28 – August 3
- Peak intensity: 95 km/h (60 mph) (10-min); 985 hPa (mbar)

On July 26, a low-pressure area was observed 600 km (375 mi) east of General Santos and was embedded along the Intertropical Convergence Zone that brought heavy rains to Mindanao. During the next three days, the low-pressure area crossed the Philippines and arrived on the West Philippine Sea on July 30, located west of Batangas. After favorable conditions, both PAGASA and JMA upgraded the system into a tropical depression and was named Jolina. On July 31, the JMA upgraded the system into a tropical storm and was given the international name Jebi. On September 2, The JMA upgraded Jebi into severe tropical storm. Jebi weakened into tropical storm and made landfall over Northern Vietnam On September 3, as well as the JTWC and JMA downgraded into tropical storm. Jebi weakened into tropical depression, as the JMA and the JTWC issued their final warning.

In Cotabato City, incessant rains caused by the low-pressure area in Mindanao submerged 25 of its 37 villages. The floods forced the city government to suspend classes for elementary both public and private schools. Heavy rains also flooded areas around the Liguasan marshland, including 14 low-lying towns in Maguindanao and seven towns in Cotabato.

At least 7 people were killed in Vietnam. The most extensive losses took place in Quảng Ninh Province where 320 homes and 200 hectares of crops were damaged. Losses in the area amounted to VND10 billion (US$476,000).

=== Tropical Storm Mangkhut (Kiko) ===
- Tropical storm (JMA)
- Tropical storm (SSHWS)
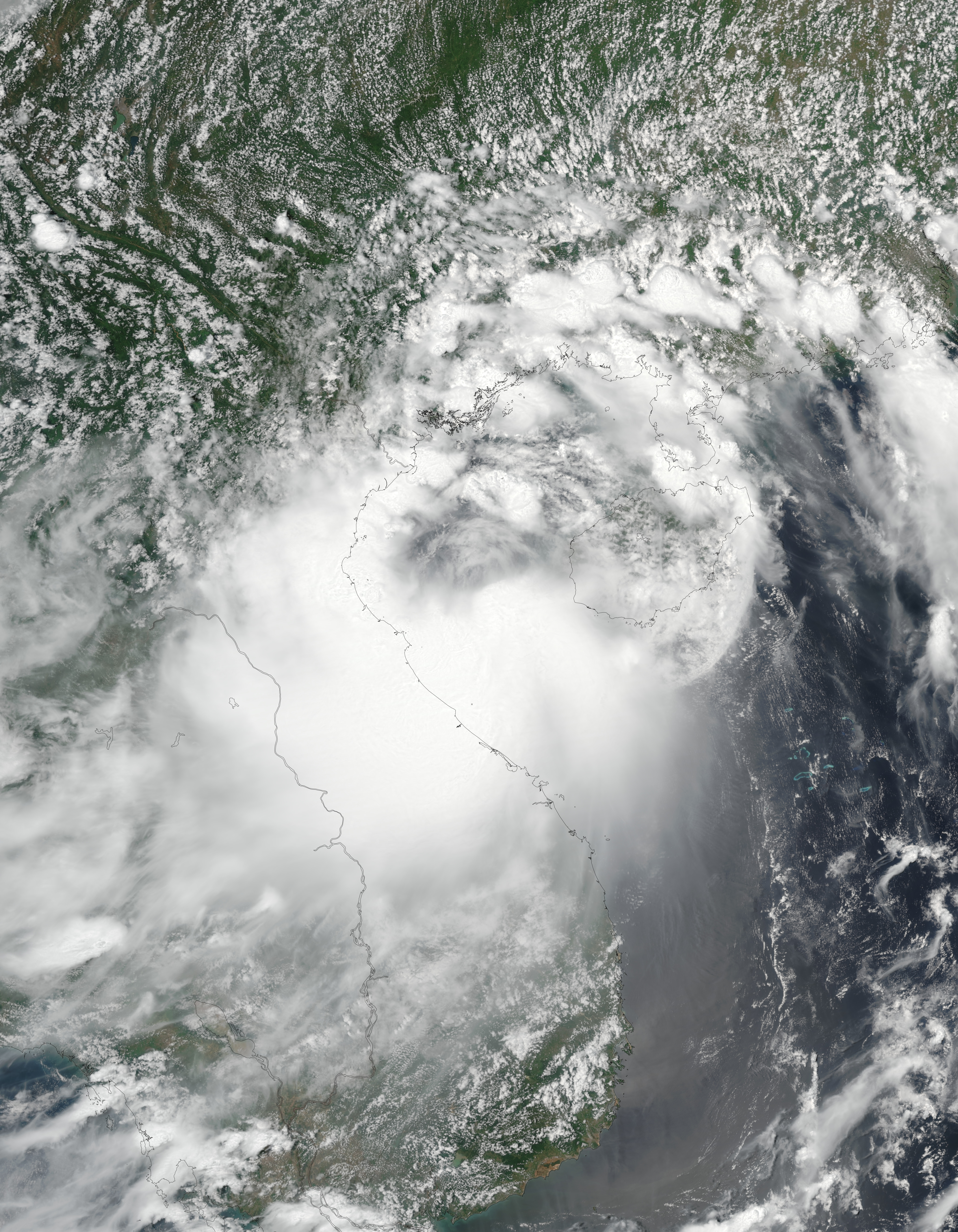
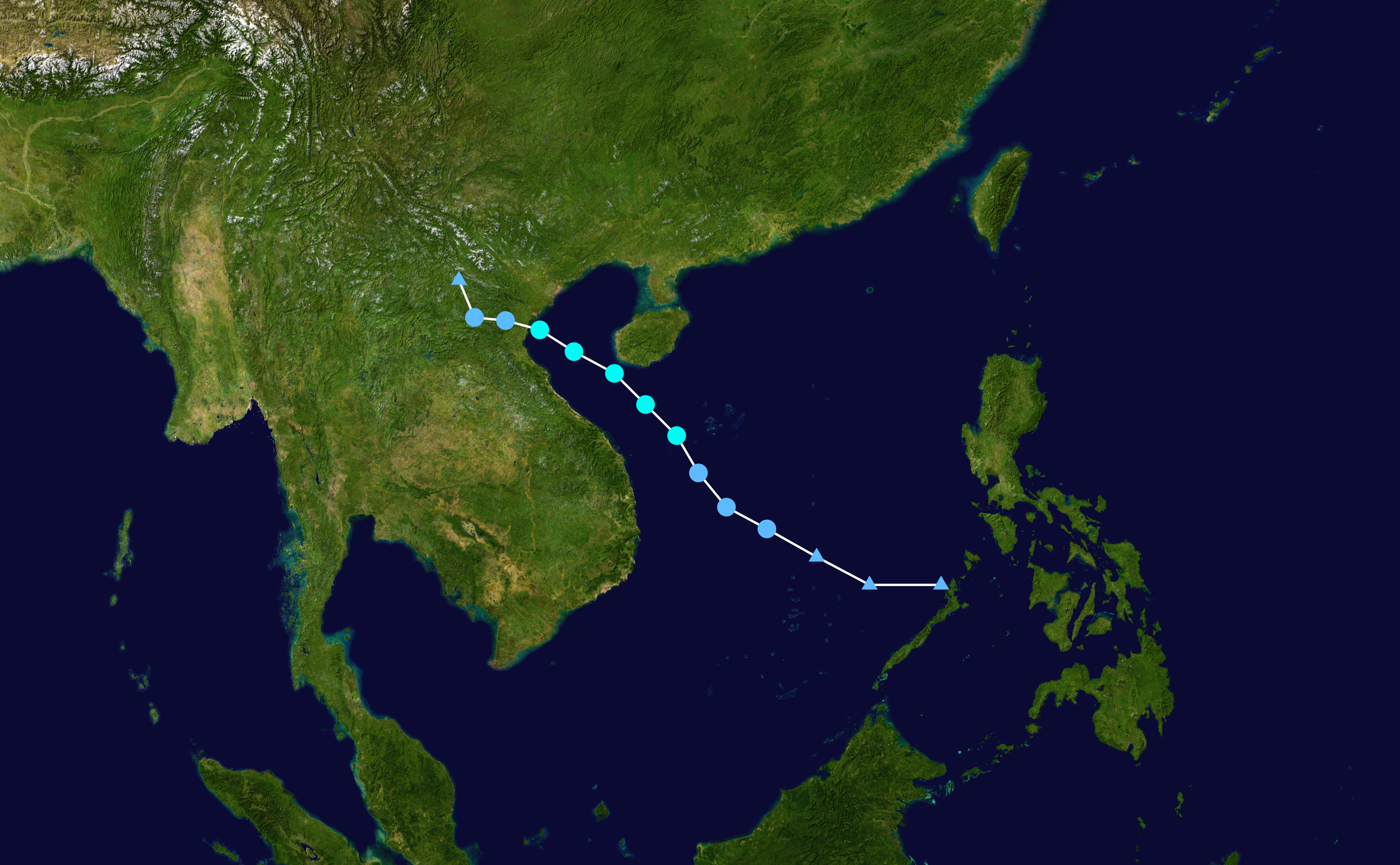
- Duration: August 5 – August 8
- Peak intensity: 75 km/h (45 mph) (10-min); 992 hPa (mbar)

Early on August 5, the JMA and PAGASA reported that a tropical depression had developed within a favourable environment for further development, about 145 km (90 mi) to the northeast of Puerto Princesa in Palawan with the latter naming it as Kiko. Later that day as the system consolidated further the JMA reported that the depression had developed into a tropical storm and named it Mangkhut, before the JTWC initiated advisories and designated it as Tropical Depression 10W. Over the next couple of days the system moved towards the north-northwest before it made landfall in Northern Vietnam during August 7 before it was last noted early the next day as it dissipated over Laos.

Downpours throughout Wednesday night till Thursday were recorded at 80 mm (3.1 in) deep on streets of the capital, causing difficulties for many people to go to work. Meanwhile, rainfall went up to about 300 mm (12 in) in central Thanh Hóa and northern Hai Phong city amid wind with a speed hitting 62–88 km/h (40–55 mph). Total damage in the country reached 1.3 trillion dong (US$56.1 million).

=== Typhoon Utor (Labuyo) ===
- Violent typhoon (JMA)
- Category 4 super typhoon (SSHWS)
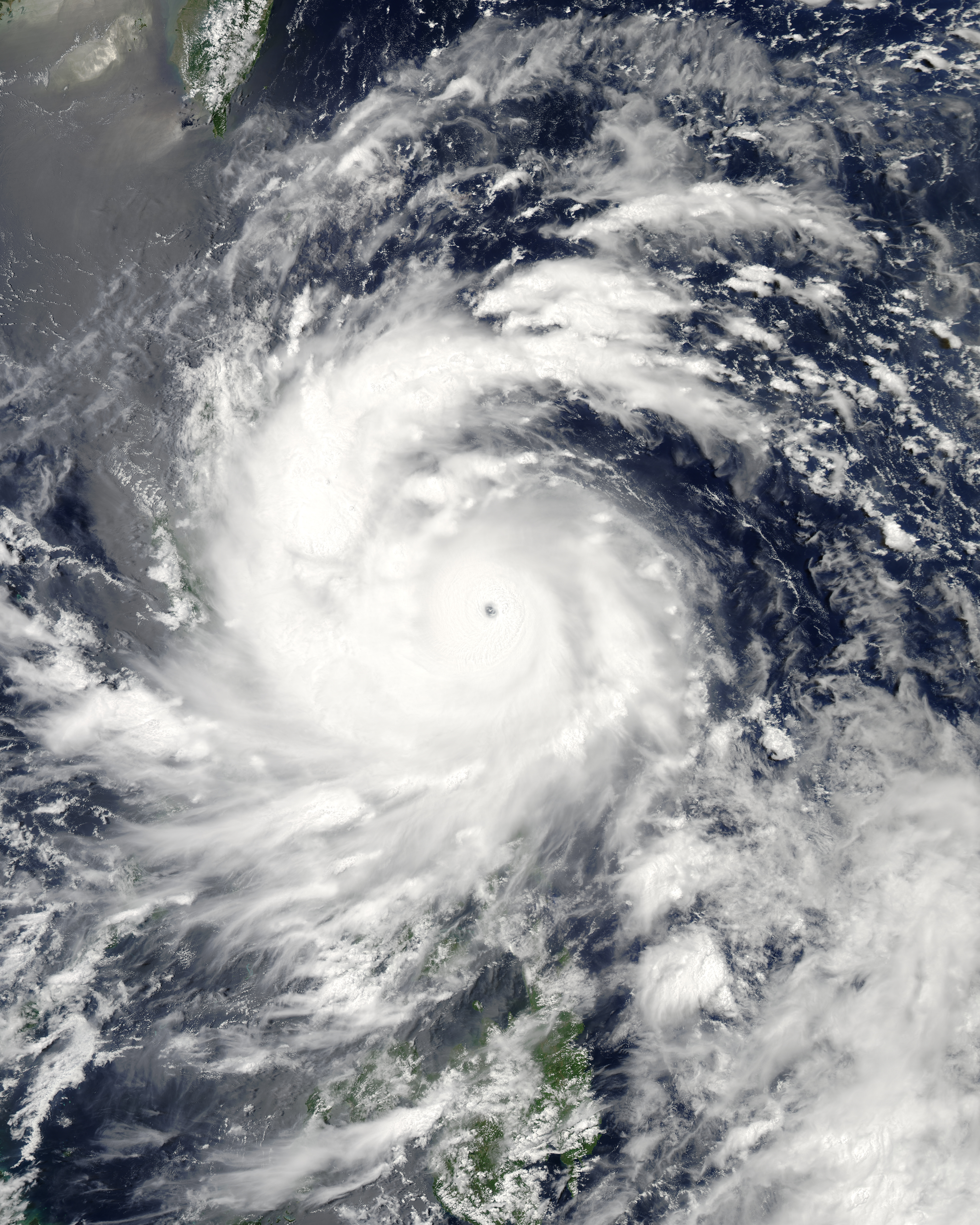
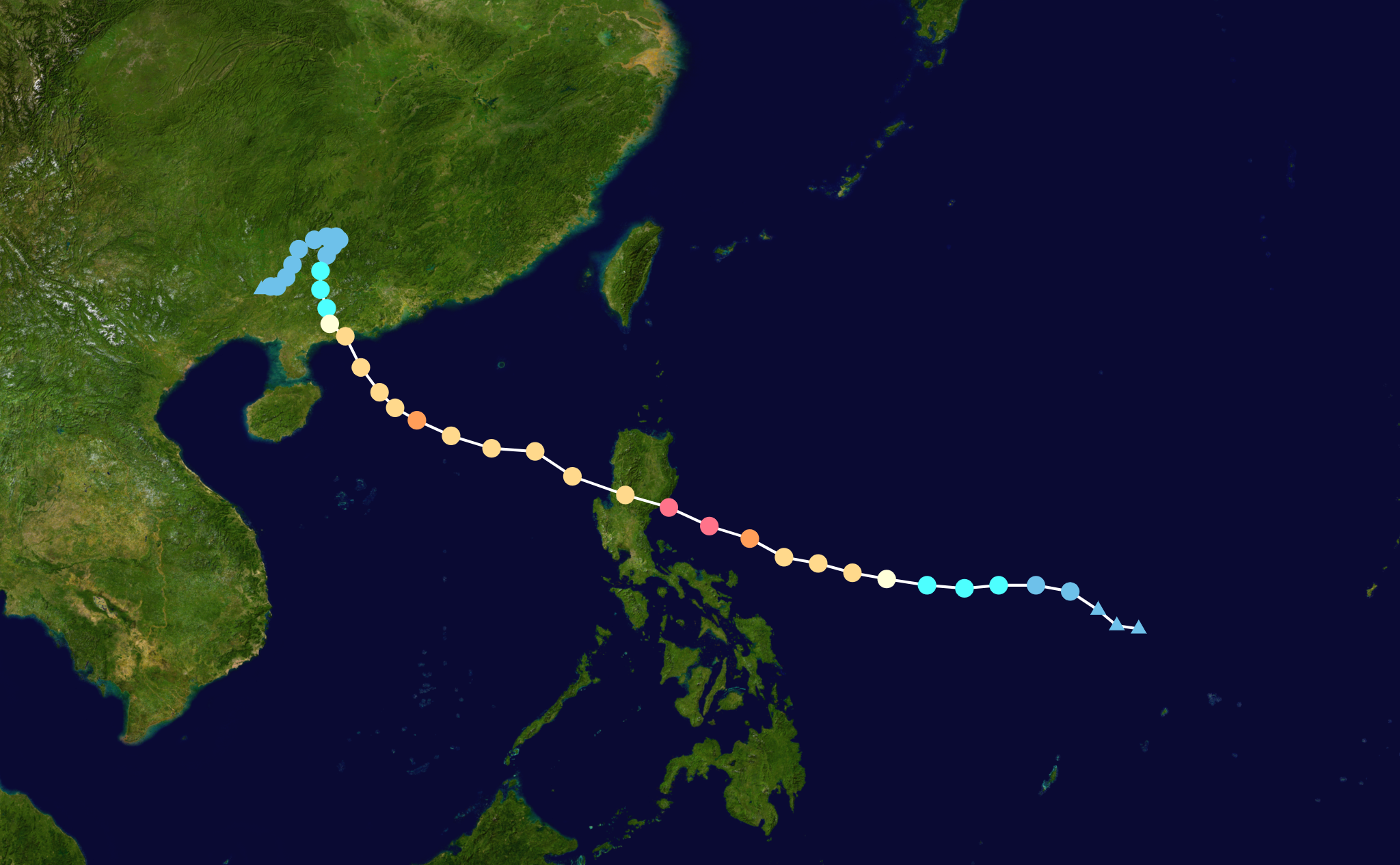
- Duration: August 8 – August 18
- Peak intensity: 195 km/h (120 mph) (10-min); 925 hPa (mbar)

On August 8, the JMA, JTWC, and PAGASA reported that a tropical depression had developed about 560 km (350 mi) to the north of Palau, with the latter naming it as Labuyo as it approached the Philippine Area of Responsibility. During the next day, the JMA reported that the depression intensified into Tropical Storm Utor. Shortly thereafter, Utor began undergoing explosive intensification, achieving typhoon status early on August 10, as an eye developed. At 1200 UTC on August 11, Typhoon Utor attained peak intensity by the ten-minute maximum sustained winds reaching 195 km/h (121 mph) and the atmospheric pressure decreasing to 925 mbar (27.3 inHg). The system became exceptionally symmetrical, as the convective bands had further deepened, which prompted JTWC upgrading Utor to a super typhoon. Continuing westward, Utor made landfall over Casiguran, Aurora that evening. It emerged into the South China Sea as a weakened storm, and Utor failed to re-intensify significantly. At 07:50 UTC on August 14, Utor made landfall over Yangjiang in Guangdong, as a minimal typhoon. On August 15, after Utor made landfall in China, its remnants continued to travel slowly in a northerly direction.

The Aurora province suffered the most damage from the typhoon, especially the coastal town of Casiguran. The capital of Manila received heavy rain but no significant damage was reported. 80 percent of the infrastructure was believed to be destroyed at Casiguran (about 2,000 homes). A total of over 12,000 homes were damaged. The town was isolated from the rest of the area when Utor's wind toppled transmission lines and cut off power. 158,000 residents were evacuated in southern China. Hong Kong was hit by winds of up to 85 km/h (53 mph) while neighbouring Macao was battered with gusts of 70 km/h (43 mph). One person was killed in China, and hundreds of flights were either cancelled or delayed. A 190-metre (210 yd) long cargo ship was sunk off the coast of Hong Kong due to waves reaching up to 15 metres (16 yd) high. The crew abandoned the vessel and were saved by rescue workers.

=== Tropical Depression 13W ===
- Tropical depression (JMA)
- Tropical depression (SSHWS)
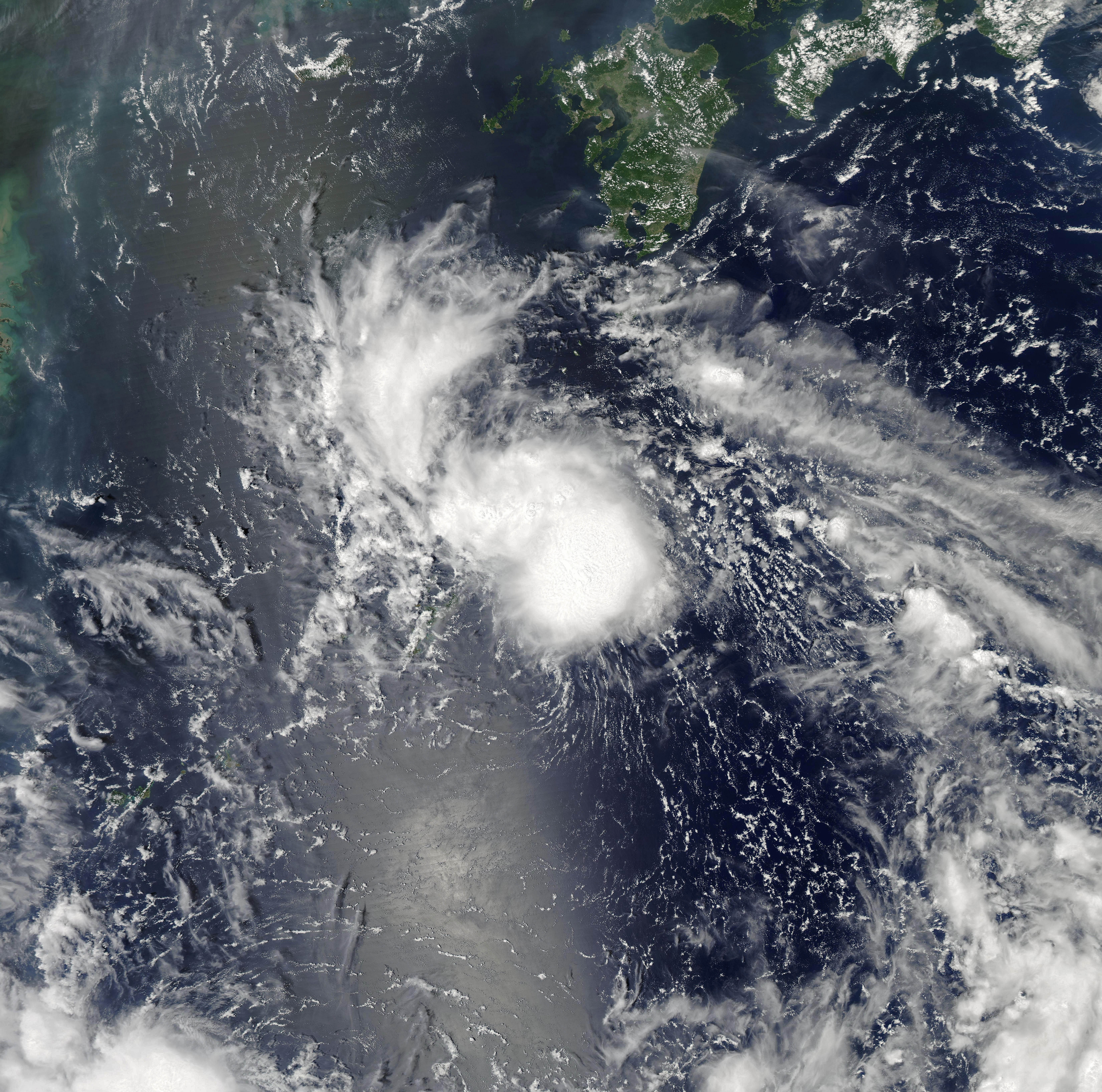
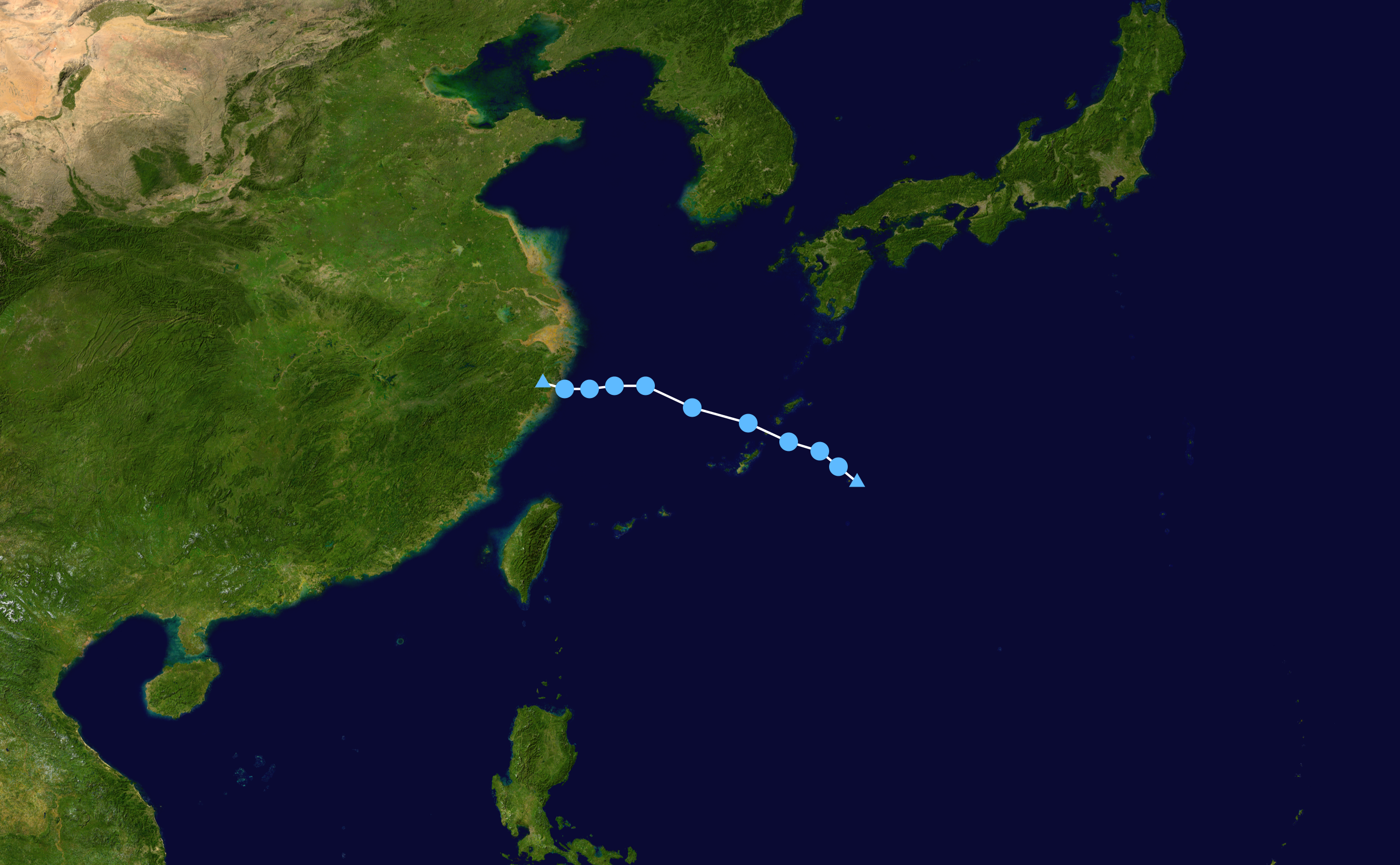
- Duration: August 15 – August 19
- Peak intensity: 55 km/h (35 mph) (10-min); 996 hPa (mbar)

On August 15, the JMA reported that a tropical depression had developed about 1,275 km (790 mi) to the southeast of Taipei. After interacting with Trami, the depression hit the Eastern Chinese coast and dissipated on August 18 and its remnants continued to move westerly track.

=== Severe Tropical Storm Trami (Maring) ===
- Severe tropical storm (JMA)
- Category 1 typhoon (SSHWS)
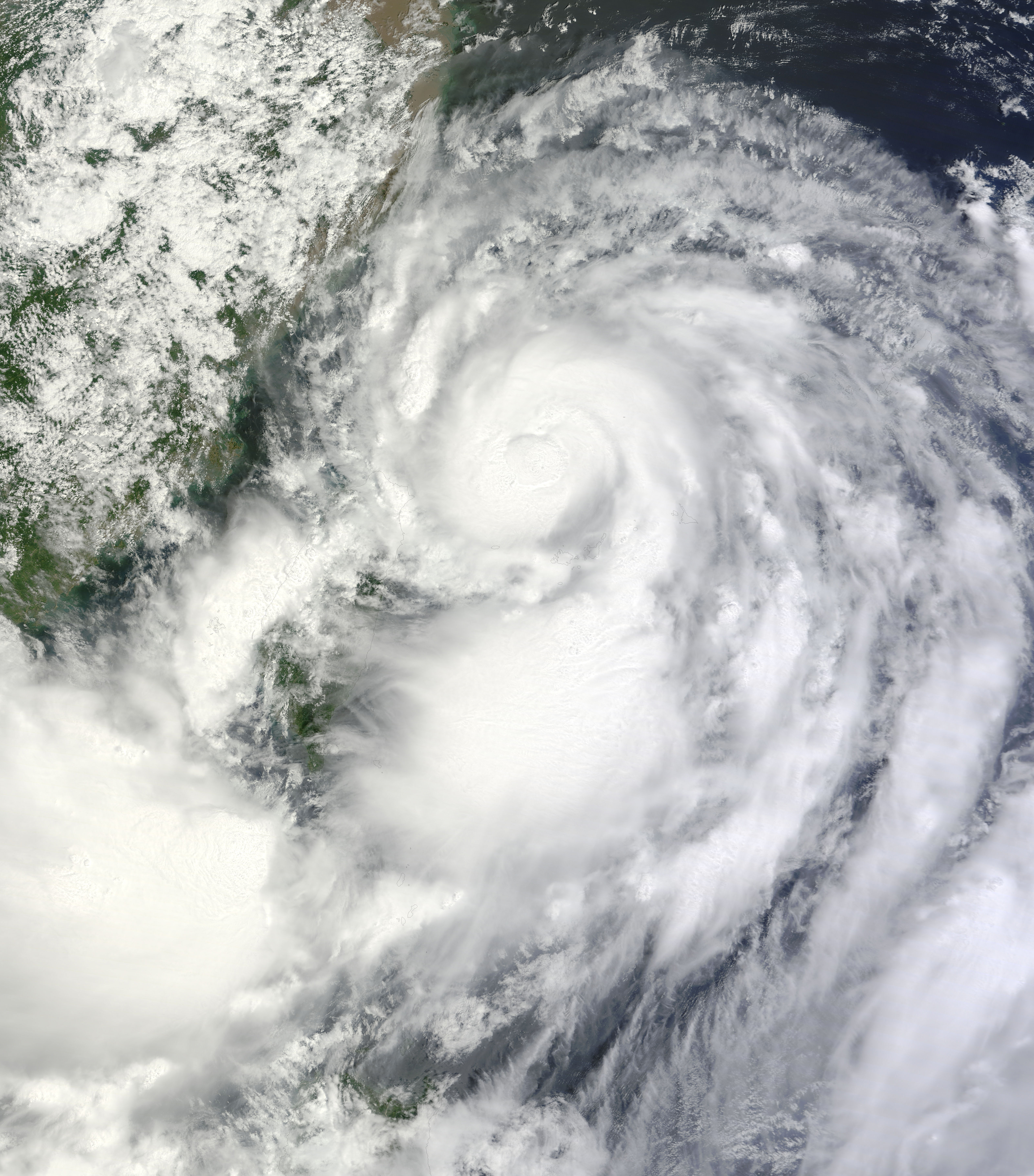
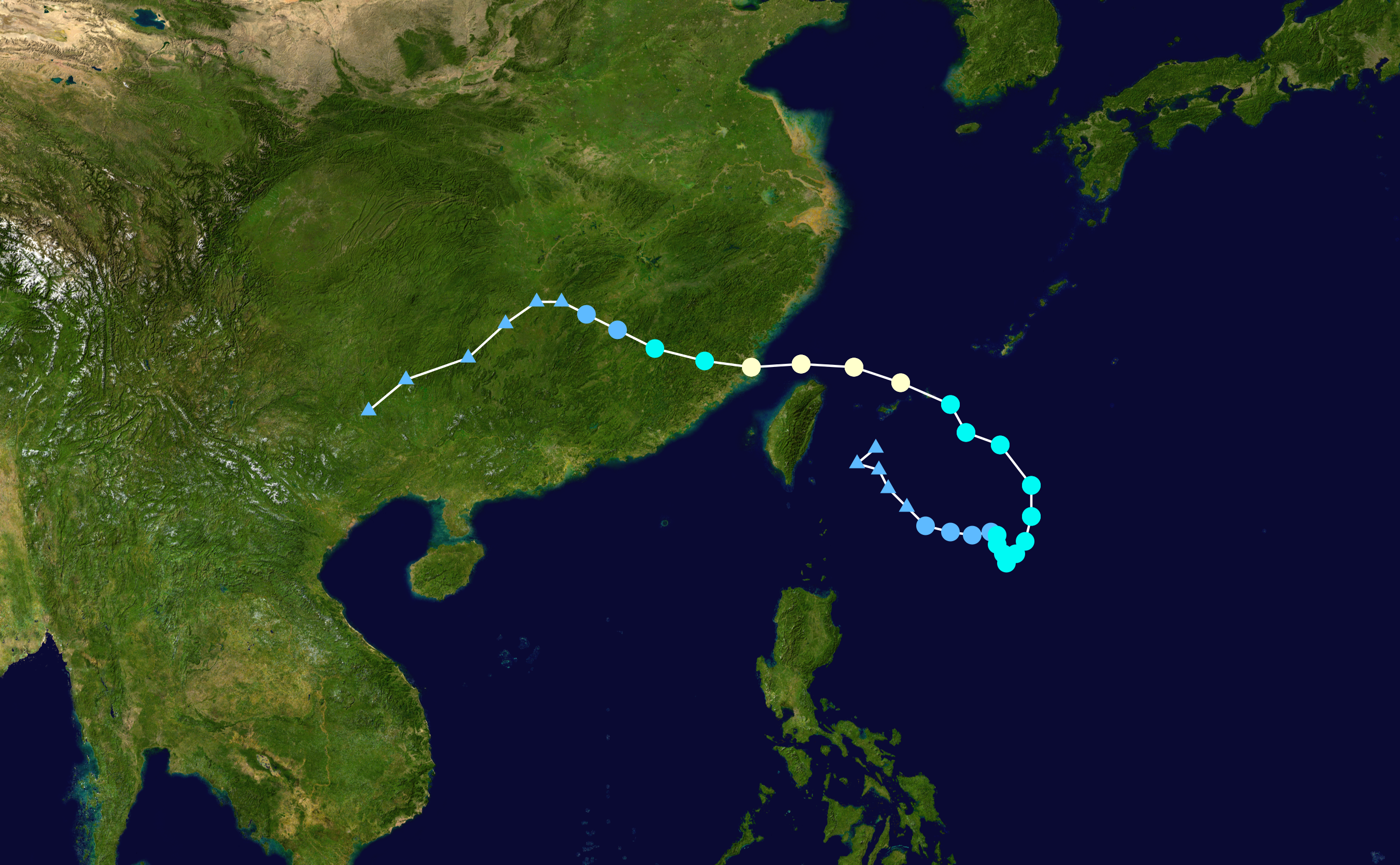
- Duration: August 16 – August 24
- Peak intensity: 110 km/h (70 mph) (10-min); 965 hPa (mbar)

On August 16, a tropical depression had developed within a marginal environment for further development about 340 kilometres (210 mi) southeast of Taipei, Taiwan. During that day, the low level circulation consolidated while moving to the southeast, given the name Maring by PAGASA. It interacted with another depression to the north, exhibiting the Fujiwhara effect. On August 18, the depression also known as Maring strengthened into a Tropical Storm Trami according to the JMA, while steadily tracking generally eastwards. Trami weakened below typhoon intensity on August 23. The remnants of the system continued to move inland in a westerly direction. Trami made landfall in the Fujian province of China on August 22, 2:40 a.m. local time.

On August 18, officials in Luzon closed classes and government buildings in some cities due to heavy rainfall. Majors areas in Metro Manila and nearby provinces reported severe flooding. The Marikina River rose as high as 19 m (62 ft), forcing authorities evacuate nearby residents. Four provinces and Metro Manila were declared a state of calamity, and there were 18 deaths. The Yaeyama and Miyako Islands of Japan were battered with gusts from Trami as the system headed for Taiwan and China. In Taiwan, the storm produced gale-force winds and heavy rainfall in northern Taiwan, with Taipei receiving 12 in (300 mm) of rain. Trami injured 10 people and forced 6,000 to evacuate, but damage was minor in Taiwan. In Fujian in eastern China, winds peaked at 126 km/h (78 mph), and heavy rainfall occurred in several cities, forcing over 100,000 people to evacuate. The system also intensified floods brought by earlier monsoonal rains in China, wreaking havoc.

=== Severe Tropical Storm Pewa ===
- Severe tropical storm (JMA)
- Category 1 typhoon (SSHWS)
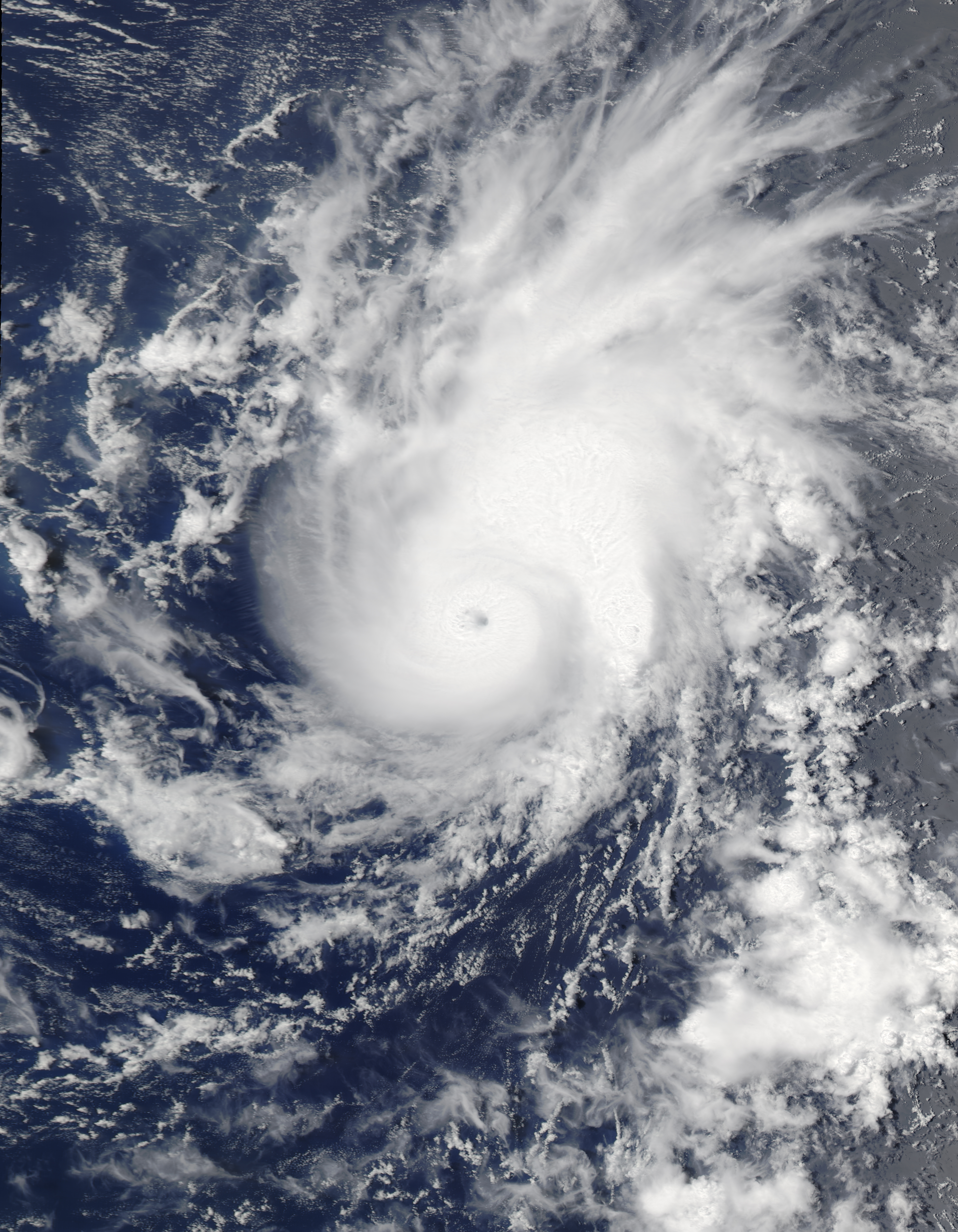
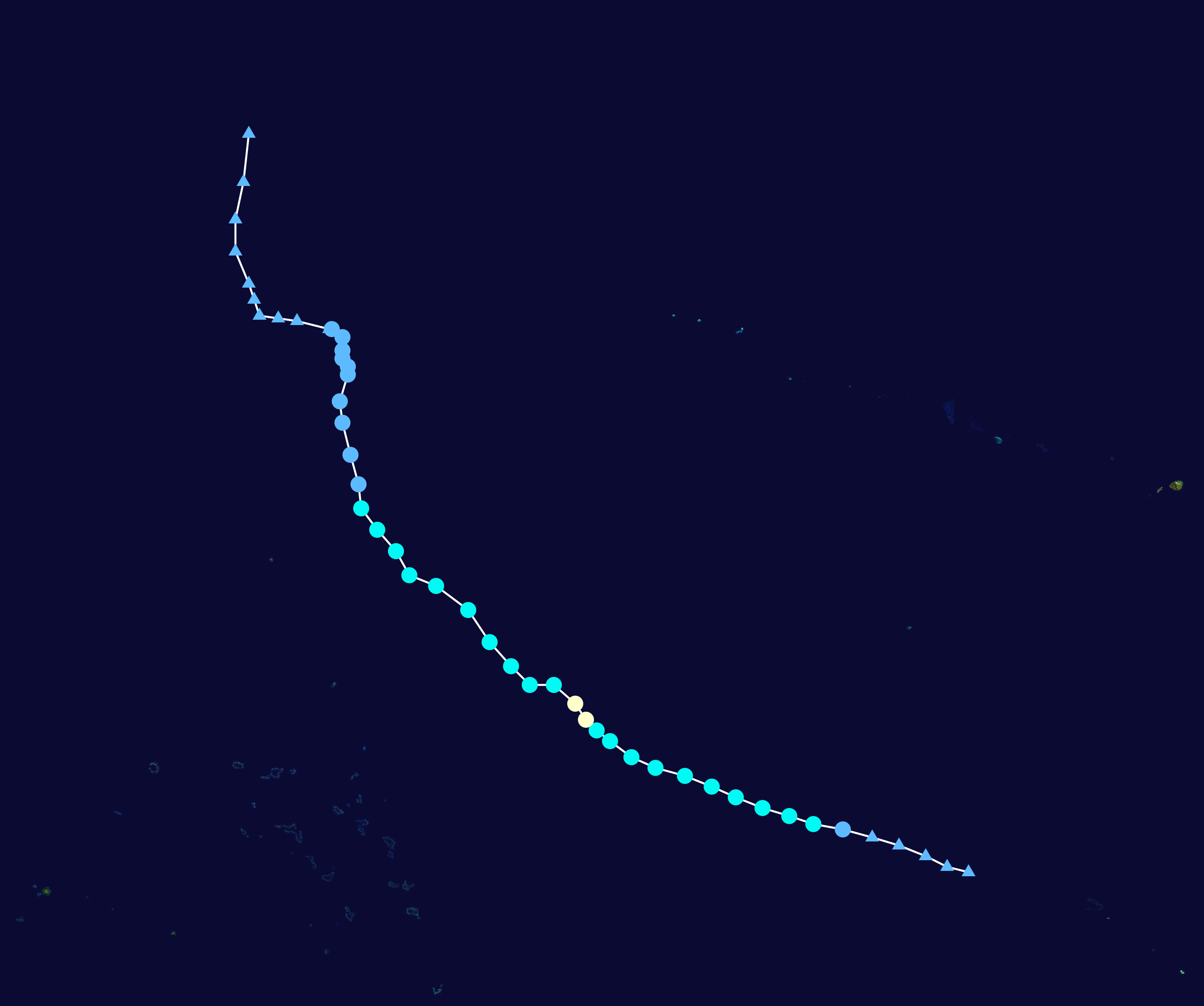
- Duration: August 18 (Entered basin) – August 26
- Peak intensity: 100 km/h (65 mph) (10-min); 990 hPa (mbar)

During August 18, the JMA and the JTWC reported that Tropical Storm Pewa, had moved into the Western Pacific basin from the Central Pacific, about 1,640 km (1,020 mi) to the southeast of Wake Island. During August 20 the JTWC reported that Pewa had become equivalent to a Category 1 hurricane on the SSHS, before reporting that the system had weakened into a tropical storm. Later that day, it was classified as a severe tropical storm by the JMA but wasn't classified as a typhoon. Pewa moved northwest as weak vertical windshear caused it to slowly weaken on August 22. On August 23, vertical windshear caused Pewa to weaken as it moved north. Pewa was then downgraded to a tropical storm later that day. Very early on August 25, Pewa was downgraded to a storm by the JMA. The next day, Pewa's circulation became exposed as it became a depression. On August 26, Pewa fully dissipated.

=== Tropical Storm Unala ===
- Tropical storm (JMA)
- Tropical depression (SSHWS)
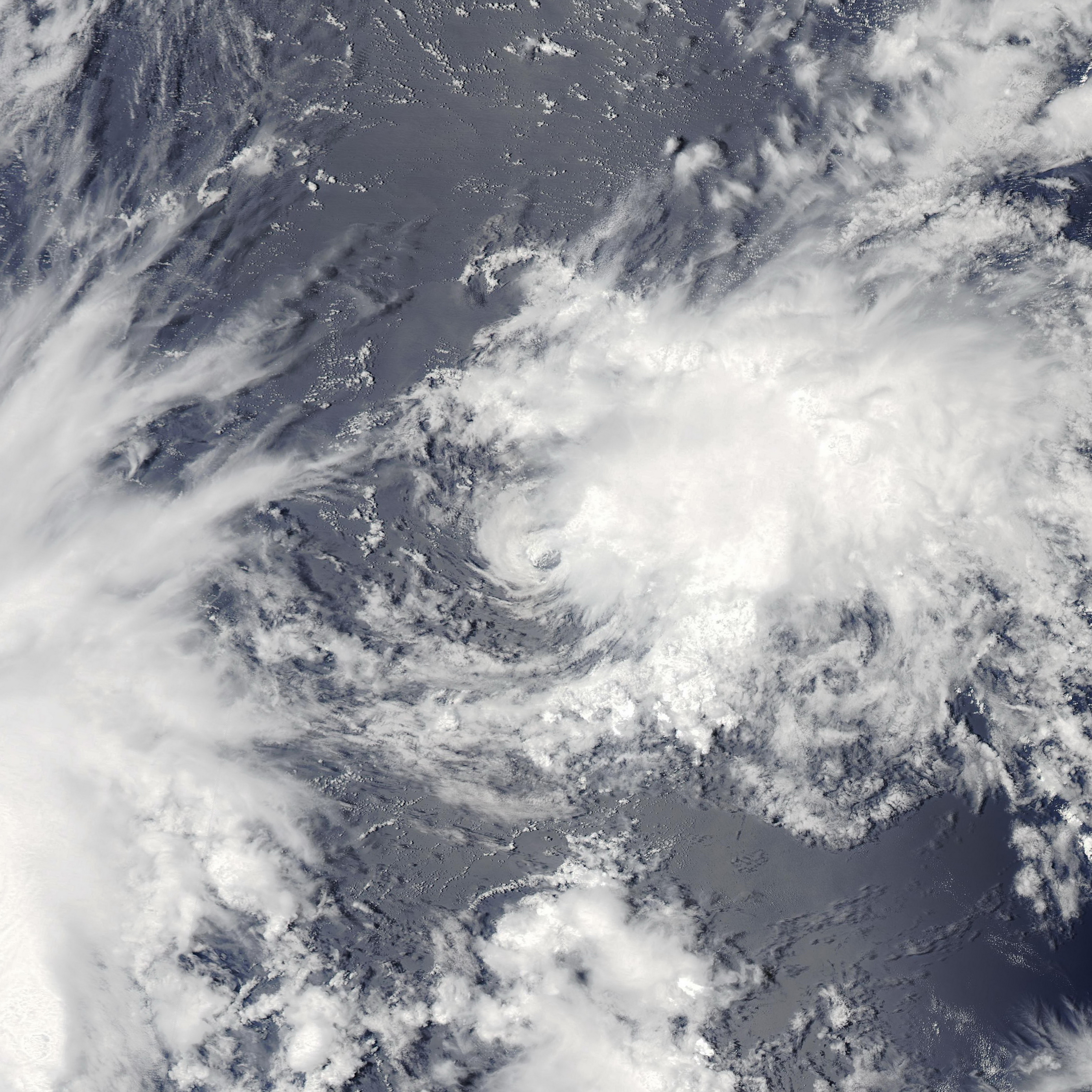
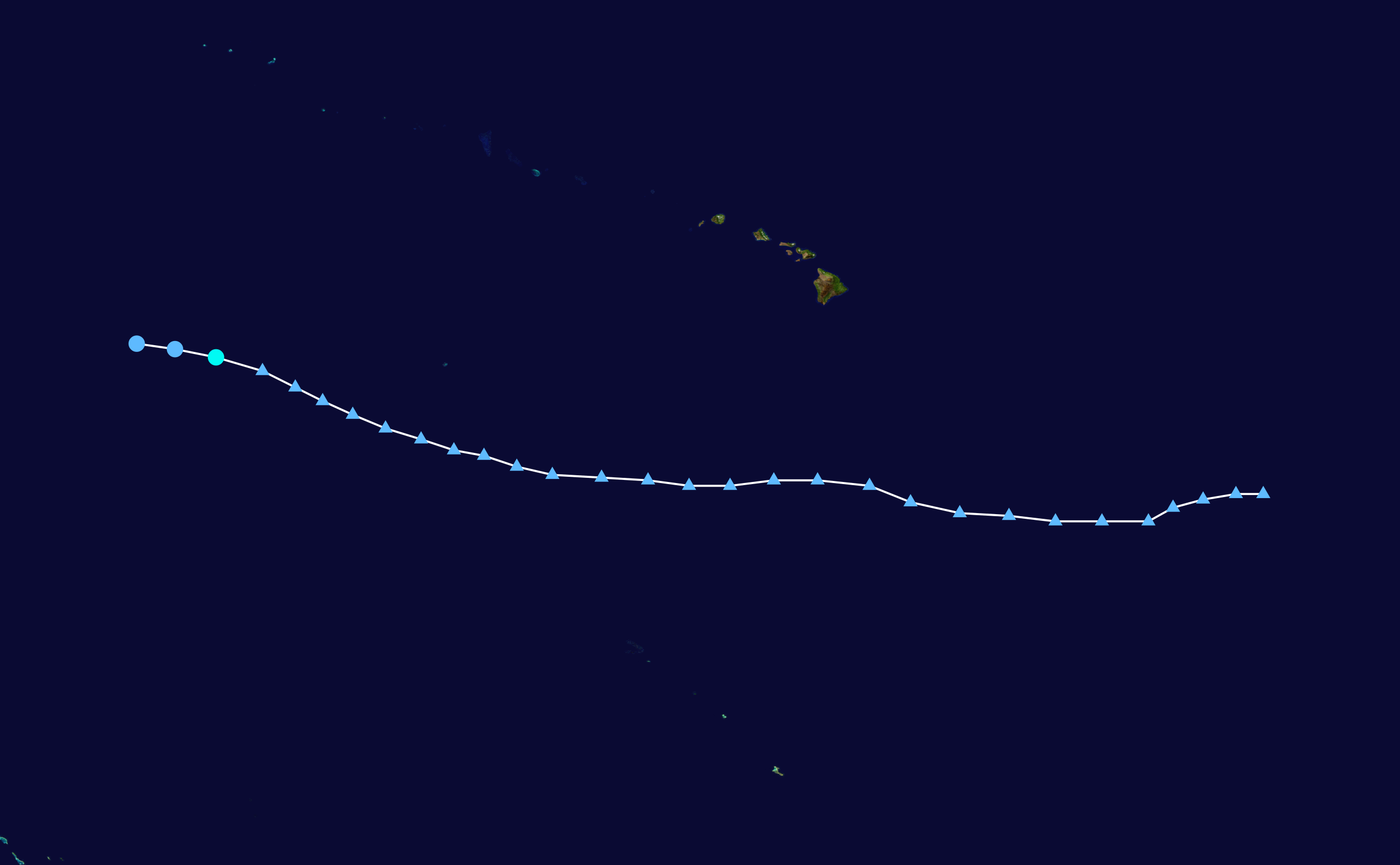
- Duration: August 19 (Entered basin) – August 19
- Peak intensity: 65 km/h (40 mph) (10-min); 1000 hPa (mbar)

During August 19, the JMA and JTWC reported that Tropical Storm Unala had moved into the Western Pacific basin from the Central Pacific, as it rapidly weakened and moved westwards into the periphery of Severe Tropical Storm Pewa. The system was last noted by the JMA later that day as it weakened into a tropical depression and dissipated.

=== Severe Tropical Storm Kong-rey (Nando) ===
- Severe tropical storm (JMA)
- Tropical storm (SSHWS)
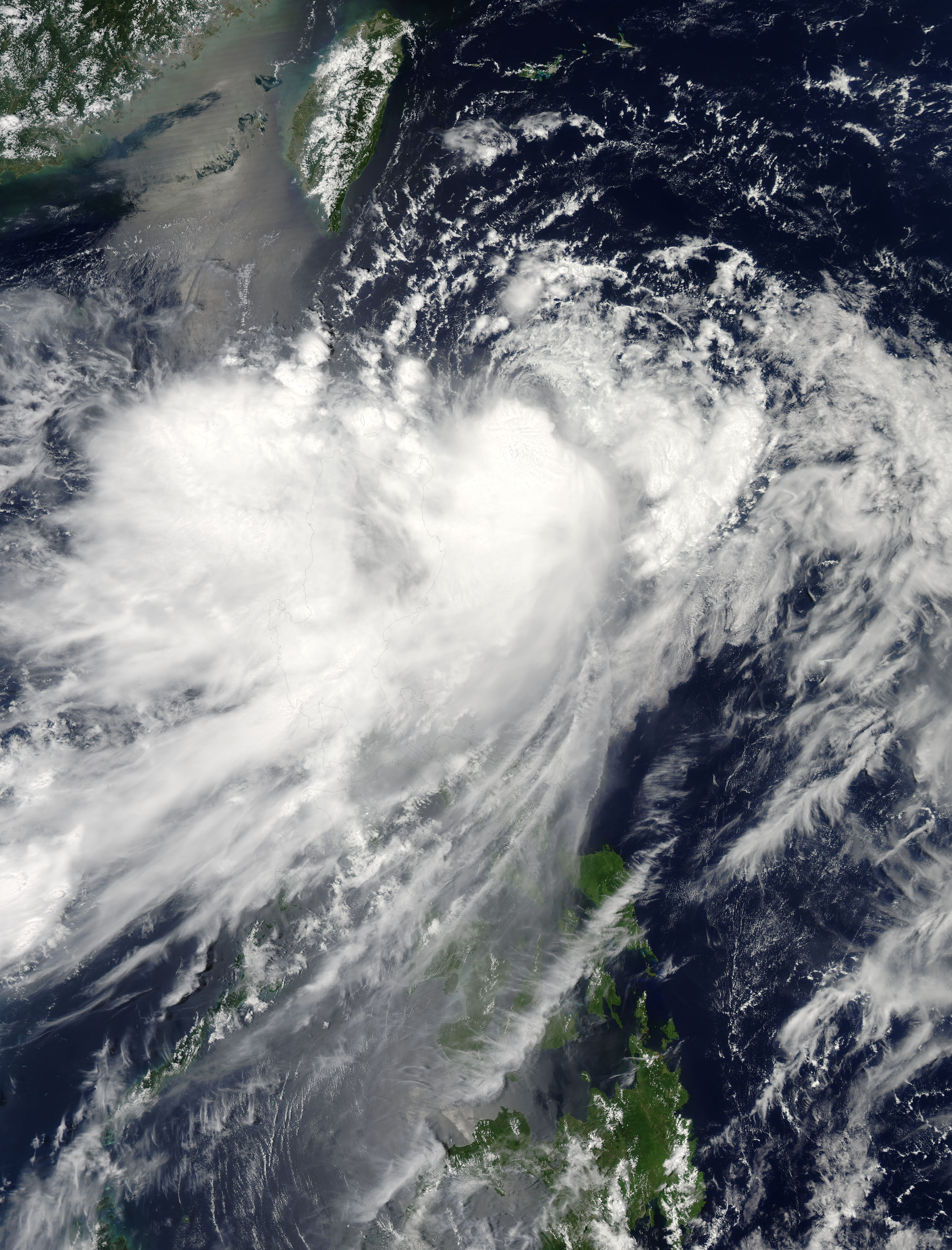
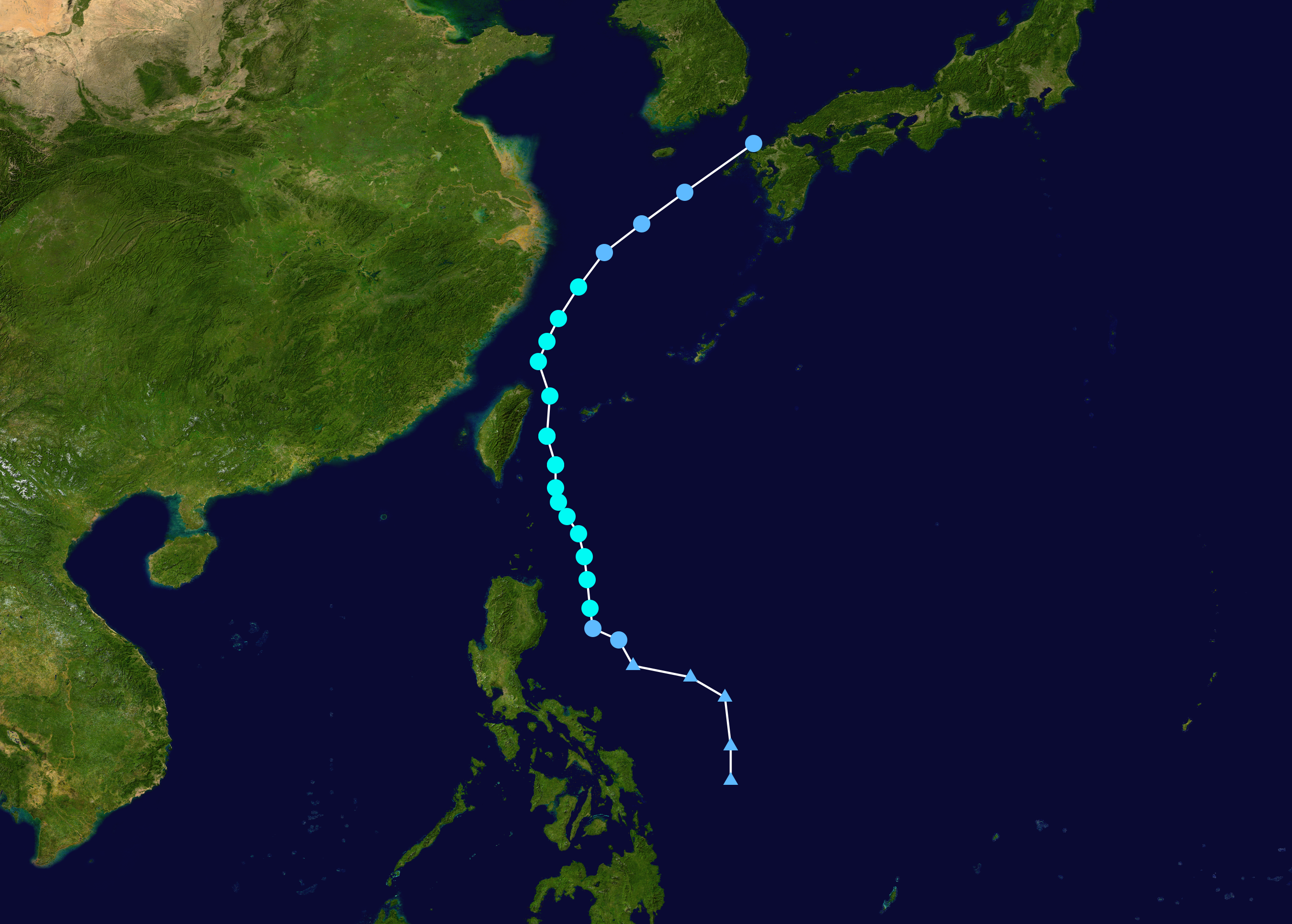
- Duration: August 25 – August 30
- Peak intensity: 100 km/h (65 mph) (10-min); 980 hPa (mbar)

On August 23, an area of convection persisted southeast of Manila. As indicated in global models, the system is forecast to consolidate as it moves poleward to more favorable environment conditions. On August 25, the JMA announced the formation of a tropical depression to the east of the Philippines and PAGASA allocated the designation Nando. The next day, the JTWC also upgraded it to a tropical depression, designating it as 14W. Later that day, the JMA upgraded Nando to a tropical storm, naming it Kong-rey. Kong-rey brought heavy showers and gusty winds in the Philippines as the storm continued to intensify. On August 28, Kong-rey reached Severe Tropical Storm strength. It was then later has an exposed circulation shortly then it was downgraded to a tropical storm on August 29 as it is reported that 3 were killed in Taiwan. Both agencies downgraded Kong-rey to a weak tropical depression, until they made their final advisory on August 30.

Damage in East China reached ¥130 million (US$21.2 million).

=== Tropical Storm Yutu ===
- Tropical storm (JMA)
- Subtropical depression (SSHWS)
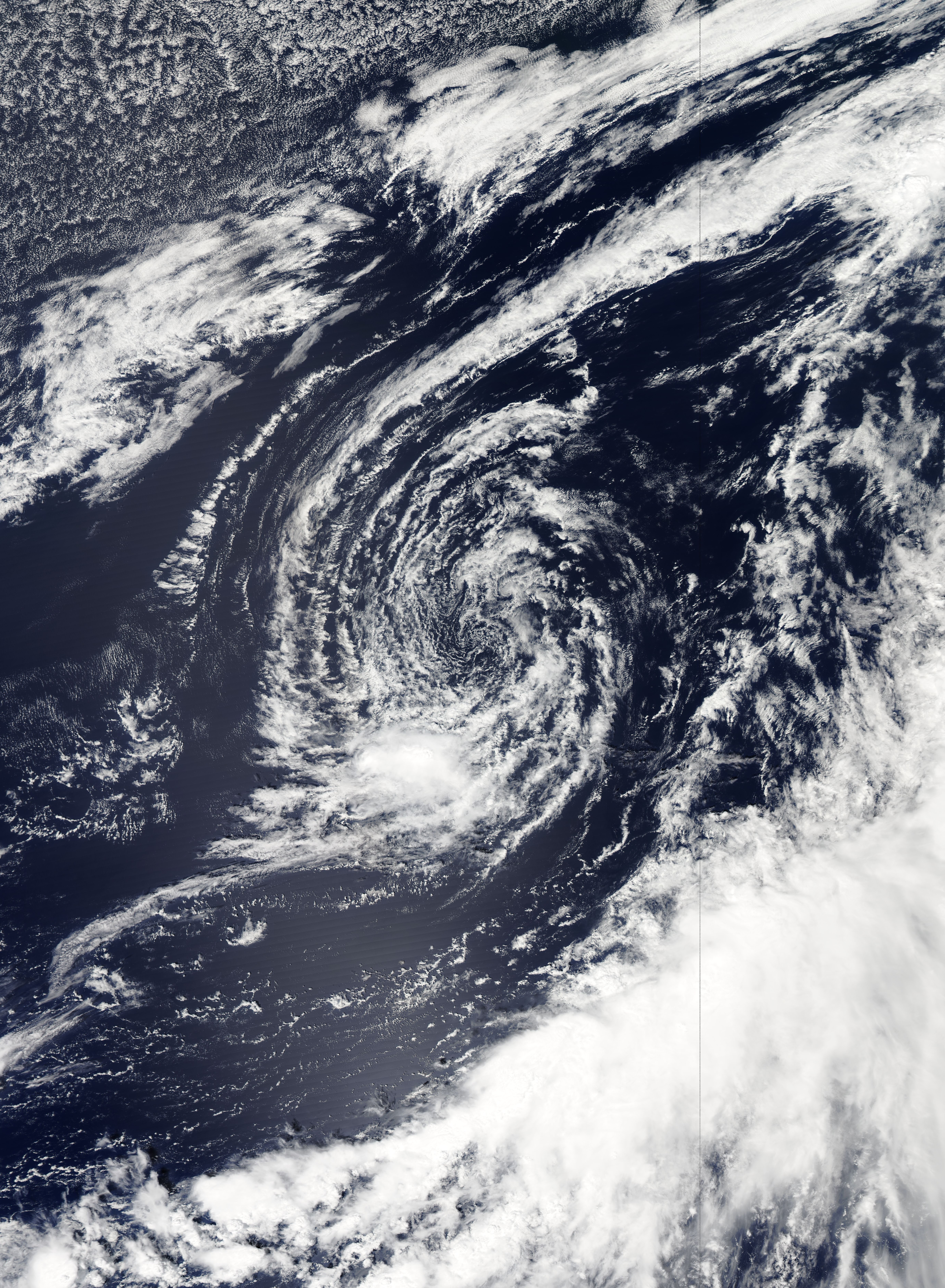
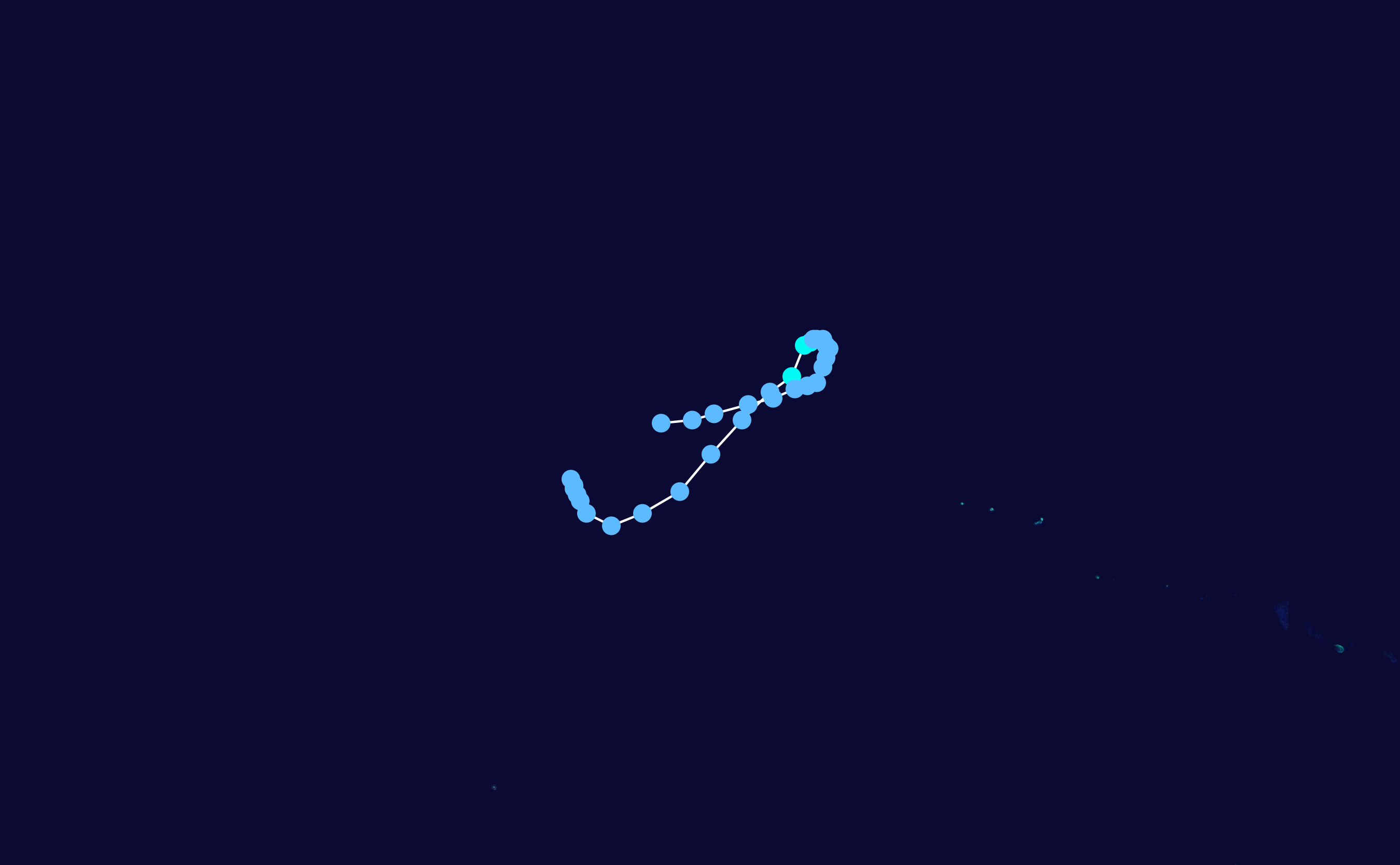
- Duration: August 29 – September 5
- Peak intensity: 65 km/h (40 mph) (10-min); 1002 hPa (mbar)

Late on August 29, the JMA reported that a tropical depression had developed about 1,145 km (710 mi) to the northeast of Wake Island. Moving northeast, over the next three days the depression gradually developed further before the JMA named it Yutu on September 1. Later that day, as dry air wrapped into the circulation and strong vertical wind shear affected the system, the JTWC declared it a subtropical low. Meanwhile, the JMA reported that Yutu had weakened into a tropical depression. Over the next few days, Yutu performed a small loop and started to move westwards. The system was subsequently last noted by both agencies on September 5, as it dissipated, while it was located about 1,425 km (885 mi) to the northeast of Wake Island.

=== Severe Tropical Storm Toraji ===
- Severe tropical storm (JMA)
- Tropical storm (SSHWS)
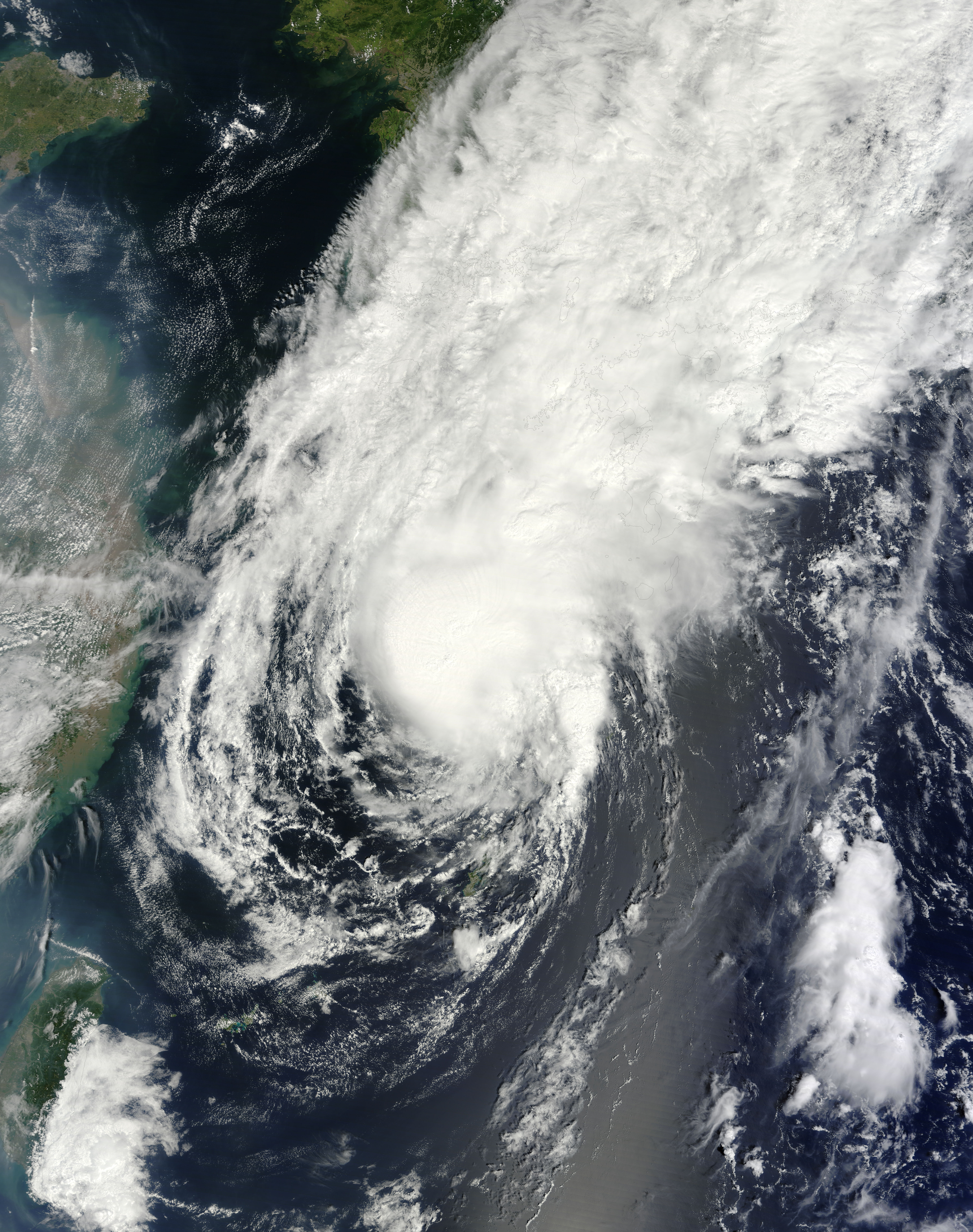
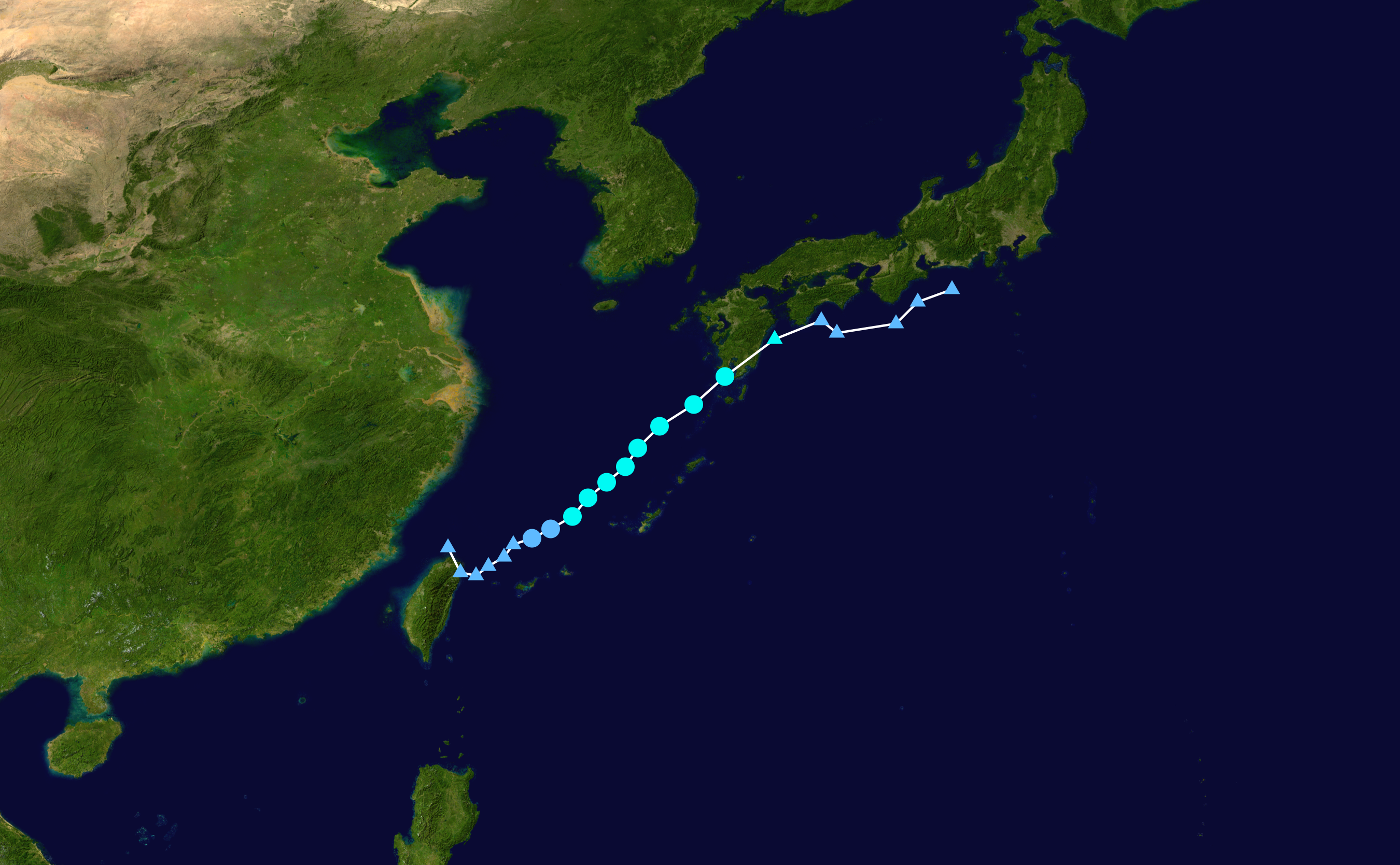
- Duration: August 31 – September 4
- Peak intensity: 95 km/h (60 mph) (10-min); 985 hPa (mbar)

Late on August 30, a disturbance formed west of Taiwan from the outer rainbands of Kong-rey. Early on August 31, the JMA upgraded it to a tropical depression that had developed about 60 km (35 mi) to the north of Taipei, Taiwan. It was then later, designated as 15W by the JTWC as it moved towards the east of Taiwan. Favorable conditions of strengthening to a tropical storm as it heads towards warm waters. Just nearly the same time when Yutu was declared a tropical storm, Tropical Depression 15W rapidly intensified into Tropical Storm Toraji. Toraji entered the southern islands of Japan as it intensified. On September 2, Toraji created a small unbalanced eye as it rapidly races towards Japan. On September 3, moderate wind shear occurred as the JMA upgraded Toraji to a severe tropical storm as it enters the southern coast of Japan killing 3. Strong vertical wind shear made Toraji weaken to a depression. The JMA reported on September 4, that Toraji had degenerated into an extratropical low, before it dissipated during the next day.

=== Typhoon Man-yi ===
- Typhoon (JMA)
- Tropical storm (SSHWS)
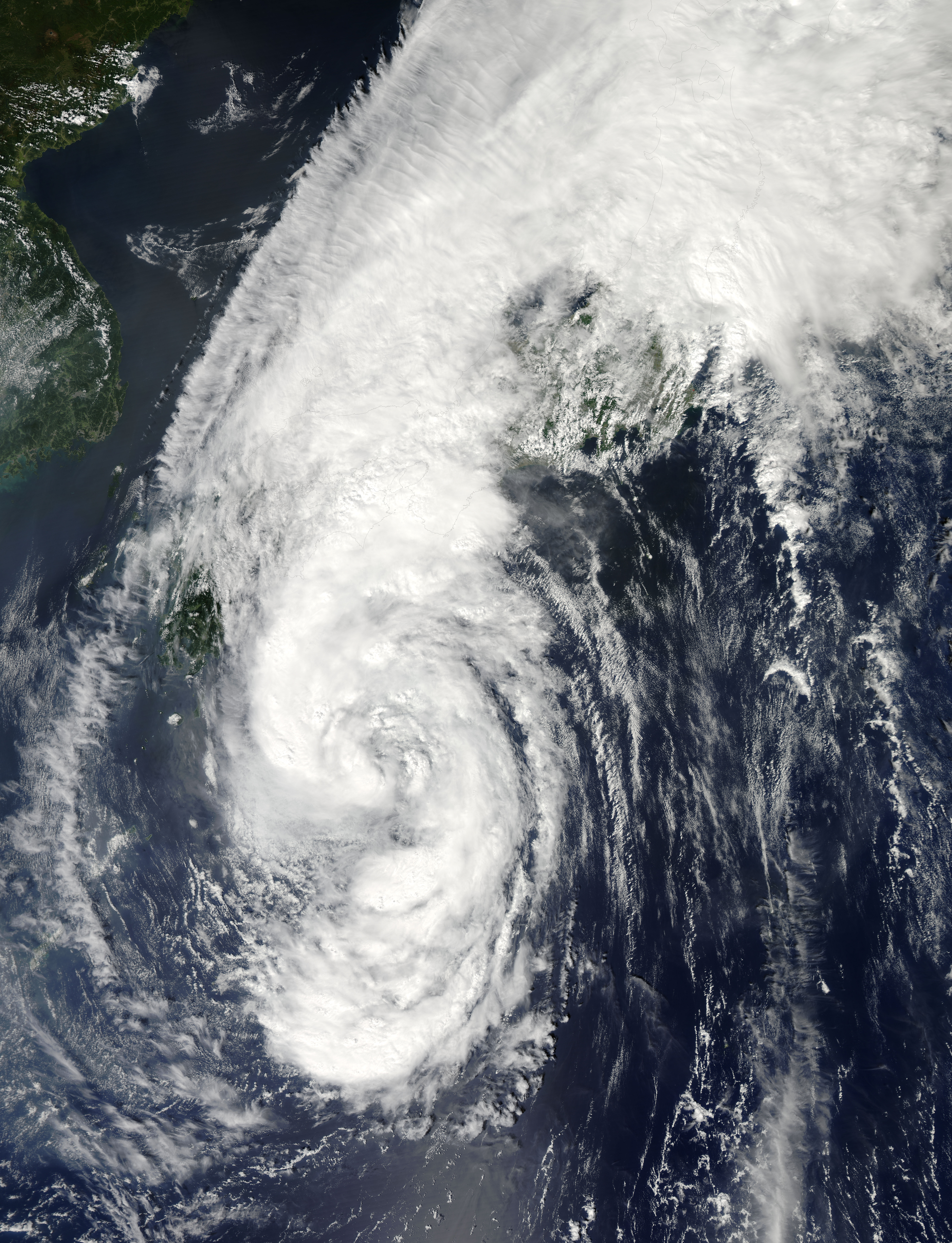
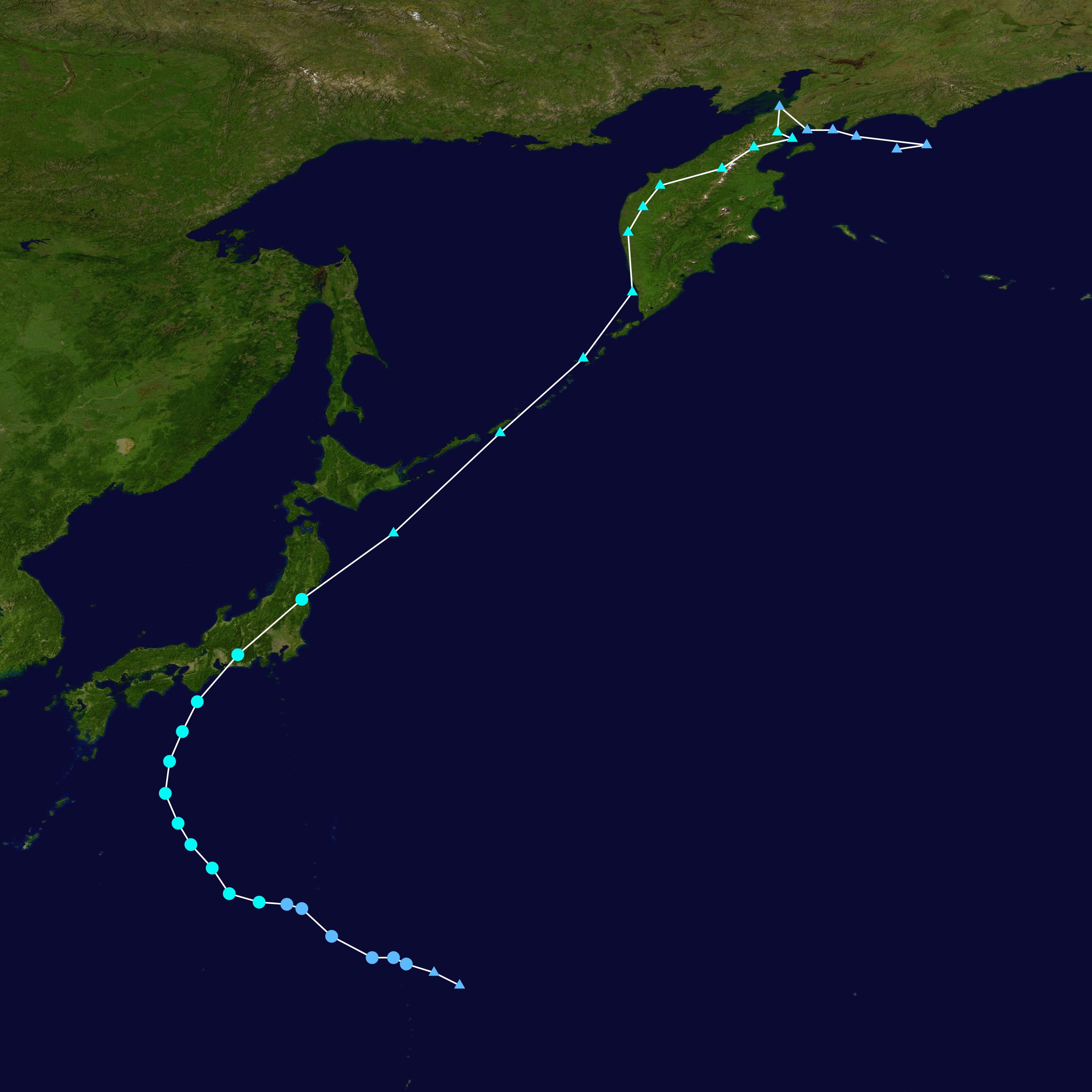
- Duration: September 11 – September 16
- Peak intensity: 120 km/h (75 mph) (10-min); 960 hPa (mbar)

A large disturbance formed near the Northern Mariana Islands late on September 9. Late on September 11, it developed into a tropical depression about 565 km (350 mi) to the northeast of Saipan. It was designated as 16W by the JTWC and upgraded to Tropical storm Man-yi on September 12, moving northwestward. Man-yi intensifying and grew larger as the pressure dropped 20 mbar (0.59 inHg). Late on September 14, Man-yi became a severe tropical storm, forming a small eye, and the next day strengthened briefly into a typhoon. Man-yi turned northward toward Japan, making landfall on September 16 near Toyohashi. Around that time, the storm became extratropical, and on September 20 Man-yi dissipated near the Kamchatka Peninsula.

Across western Japan, hundreds of thousands of people were ordered to evacuate, including 260,000 in Kyoto. The JMA issued a "special warning" for three western Japan prefectures of Fukui, Kyoto, and Shiga. Over 70 people were injured and at least one person was killed. The government of Japan set up emergency task forces and employed rescue teams. Many homes were flooded and about 80,000 were without electricity in western and central Japan. Trains in Tokyo and its vicinity were suspended and hundreds of flights were grounded.

=== Tropical Depression 18W ===
- Tropical depression (JMA)
- Tropical depression (SSHWS)
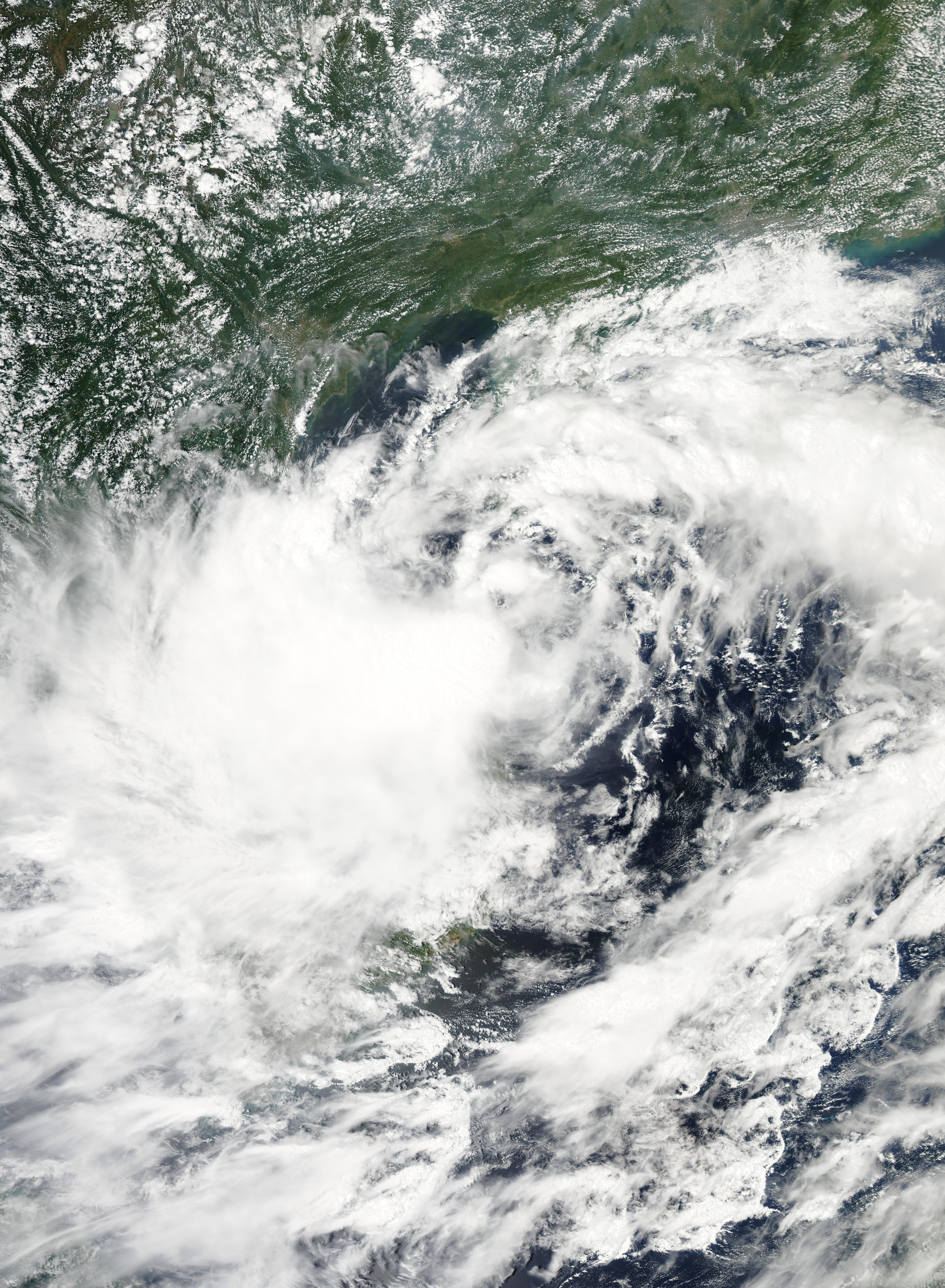
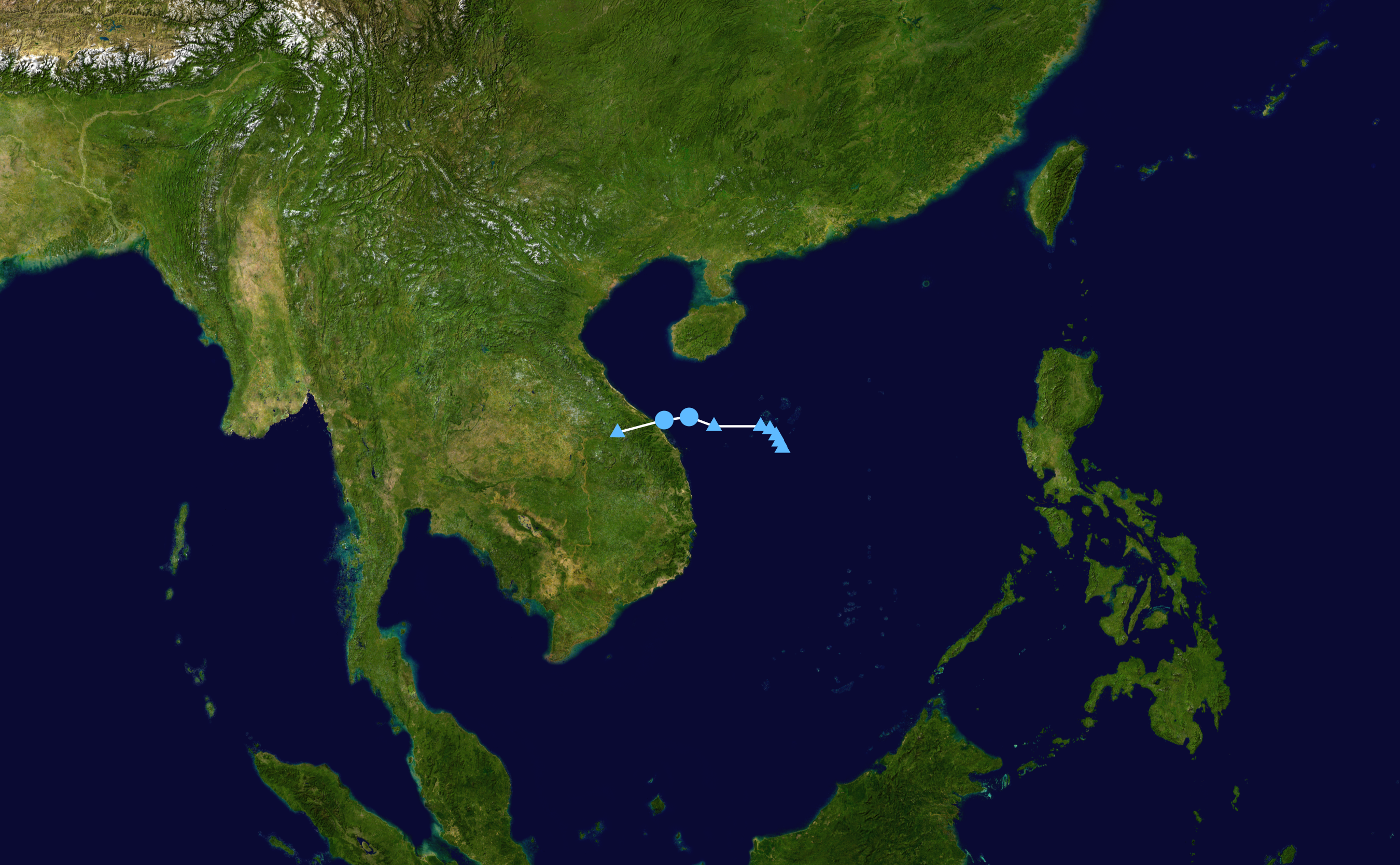
- Duration: September 15 – September 21
- Peak intensity: 55 km/h (35 mph) (10-min); 996 hPa (mbar)

On September 15, the JMA reported that a tropical depression had developed within an area of low to moderate vertical windshear, about 1,000 km (620 mi) to the southeast of Hà Nội, Vietnam. Over the next two days the depression gradually developed further as it moved westwards, before the JTWC issued a Tropical Cyclone Formation Alert late on September 17, as vertical windshear over the system decreased slightly. During the next day after the depressions low level circulation center had started to consolidate, the JTWC initiated advisories and designated it as Tropical Depression 18W. During that day the system moved westwards along the southern edge of the subtropical ridge of high pressure, before the JTWC issued its final warning on the system later that day after the depression had made landfall in Vietnam. Over the next couple of days the system continued to move westwards and moved through Vietnam, Laos and Thailand, before it was last noted on September 21, over the Thai province of Phetchabun.

In Vietnam, flooding triggered by the storm killed at least seven people and 5,000 homes were damaged or destroyed. Severe flooding took place in neighboring Laos where at least 10,000 structures were damaged and losses reached $61 million.

=== Typhoon Usagi (Odette) ===
- Violent typhoon (JMA)
- Category 4 super typhoon (SSHWS)
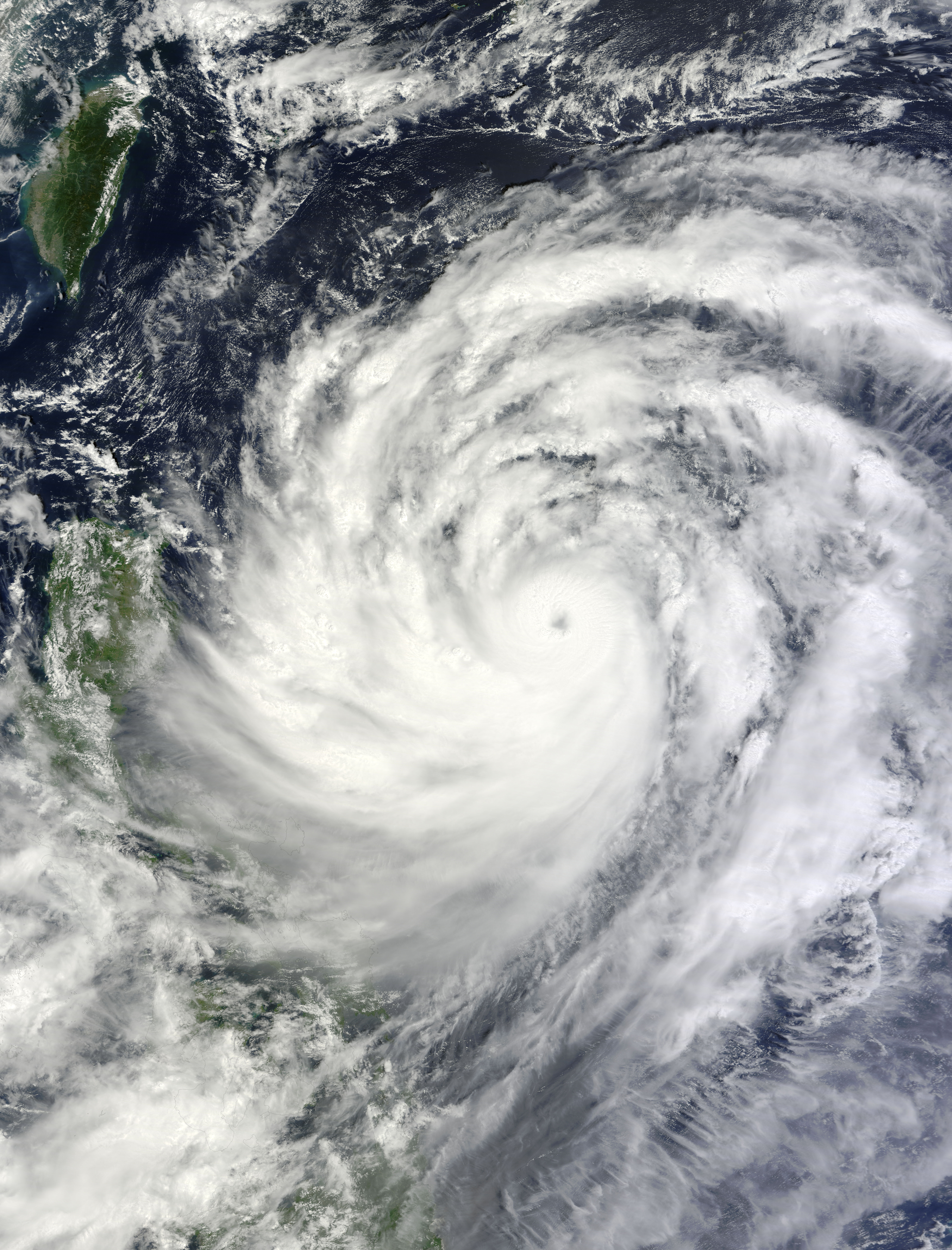
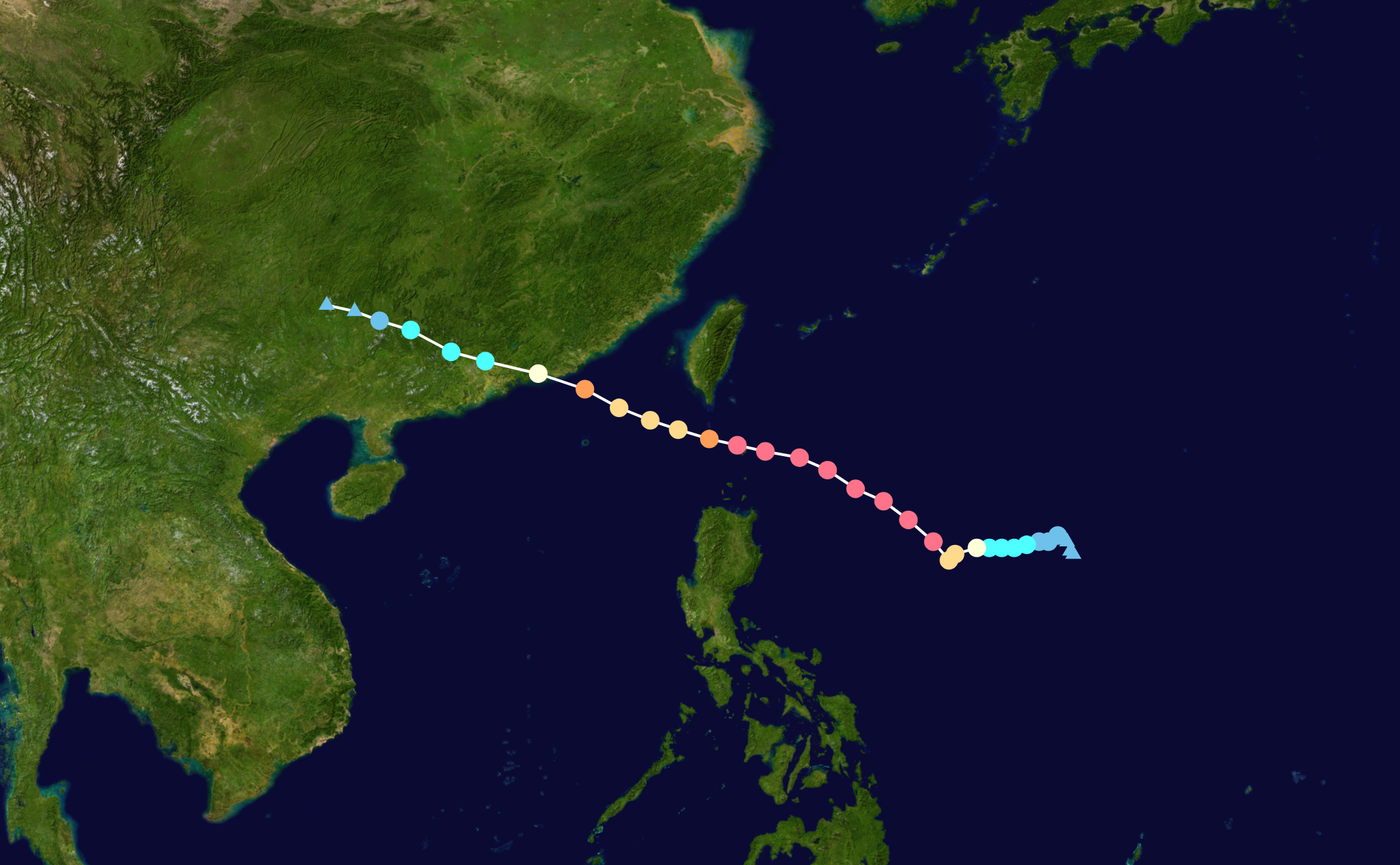
- Duration: September 16 – September 24
- Peak intensity: 205 km/h (125 mph) (10-min); 910 hPa (mbar)

From the southwest monsoon combined with the outflow of Typhoon Man-yi, a couple of disturbances was created on September 14. Early on September 16, it became a tropical depression which developed within an area of low wind shear about 1,300 km (810 mi) east of Manila in the Philippines. During that day as the circulation became better defined, PAGASA named the system "Odette", and later JMA upgraded the system to Tropical Storm Usagi. On September 17, JTWC upgraded Usagi to a tropical storm, and the next day both JMA and JTWC upgraded Usagi to a typhoon due to a developing eye. On September 19, Usagi began explosive intensification and formed a round eye; as the result, JTWC upgraded Usagi to a Category 4 super typhoon on the SSHWS, and the typhoon reached its peak intensity at 18Z. On September 20, Usagi began an eyewall replacement cycle and weakened due to land interaction between Taiwan and Luzon. When Usagi entered the Bashi Channel early on September 21, JTWC downgraded it to a typhoon due to weakening convection. At 11:40 UTC (19:40 CST) on September 22, Usagi made landfall over Shanwei, Guangdong, China. Soon, JTWC issued the final warning of Usagi, and JMA downgraded it to a severe tropical storm at 18Z. On September 23, JMA downgraded Usagi to a tropical depression in Guangxi.

=== Severe Tropical Storm Pabuk ===
- Severe tropical storm (JMA)
- Category 2 typhoon (SSHWS)
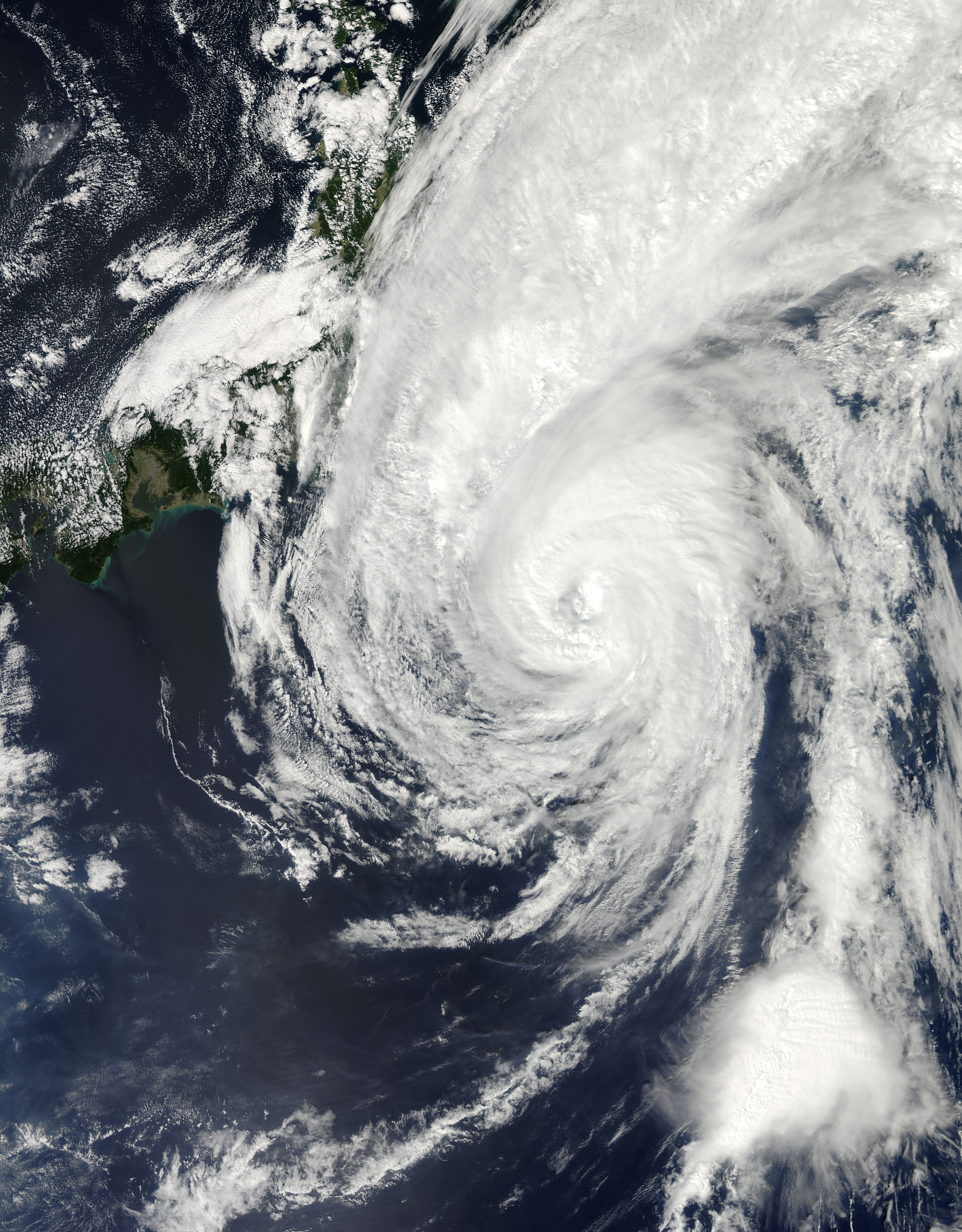
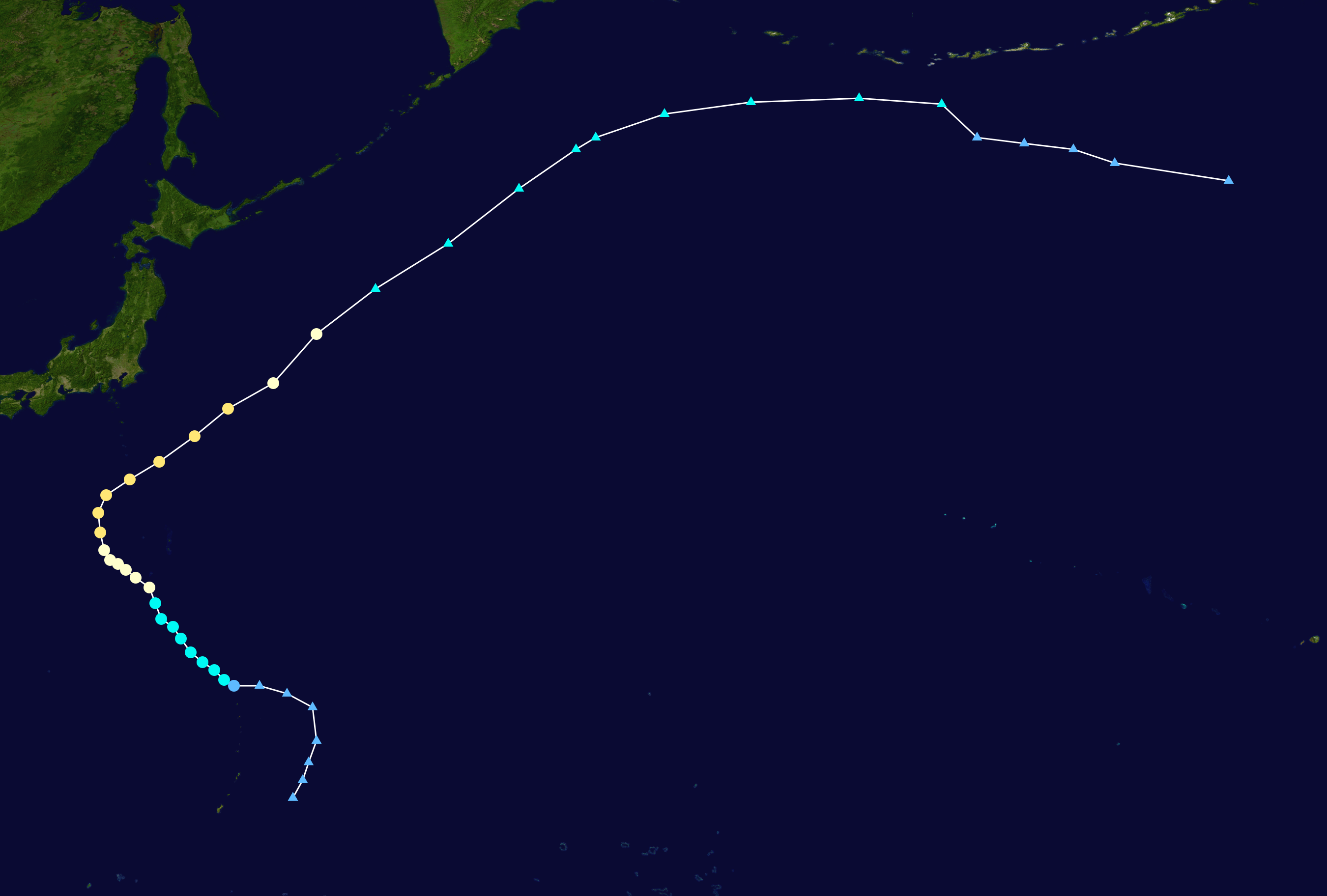
- Duration: September 19 – September 27
- Peak intensity: 110 km/h (70 mph) (10-min); 965 hPa (mbar)

On September 19, the JMA reported that a tropical depression had developed about 325 km (200 mi) to the southeast of the Northern Mariana Islands, Saipan. over the next couple of days the system moved towards the northwest before the JTWC initiated advisories on the system and designated it as Tropical Depression 19W during September 21. Later that day, the JTWC upgraded it to a tropical storm as the JMA named it Pabuk very early on September 22. Pabuk just maintained its strength as it created a weak eye on September 23. Pabuk also enhanced the southwest monsoon which brought heavy floods in the Philippines and created a disturbance which will later be Typhoon Wutip. The eye became bigger as it headed towards warm waters the next day. Pabuk was upgraded to a Category 2 typhoon by the JTWC but the JMA still has called this as a severe tropical storm on September 24. After reaching its peak intensity the following day, Severe tropical storm Pabuk weaken to a Category 1 typhoon on early on September 26. It gradually weakened before transitioning into an extratropical cyclone on September 27. Pabuk fully dissipated as it crossed the International Date Line on September 29.

=== Typhoon Wutip (Paolo) ===
- Typhoon (JMA)
- Category 3 typhoon (SSHWS)
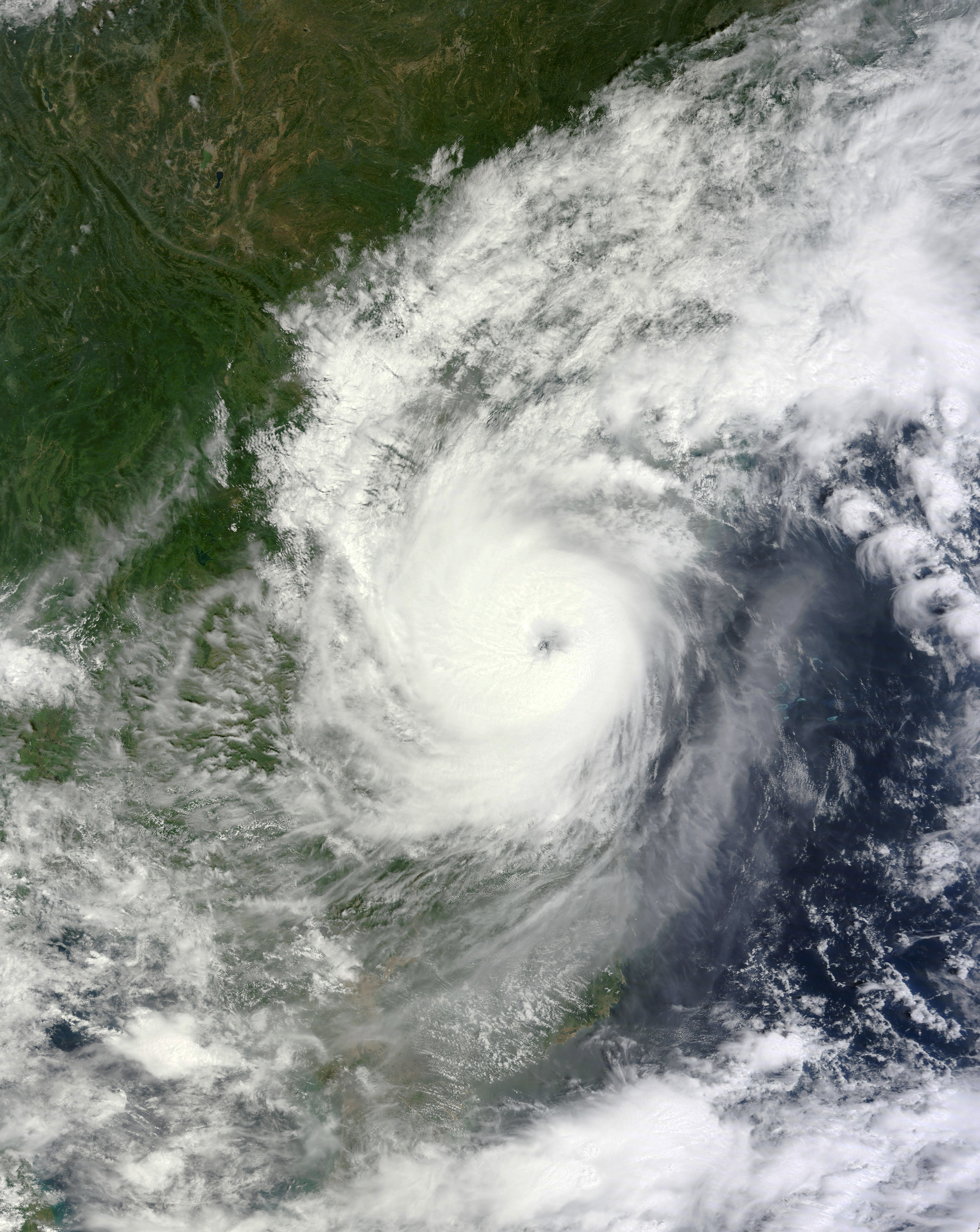
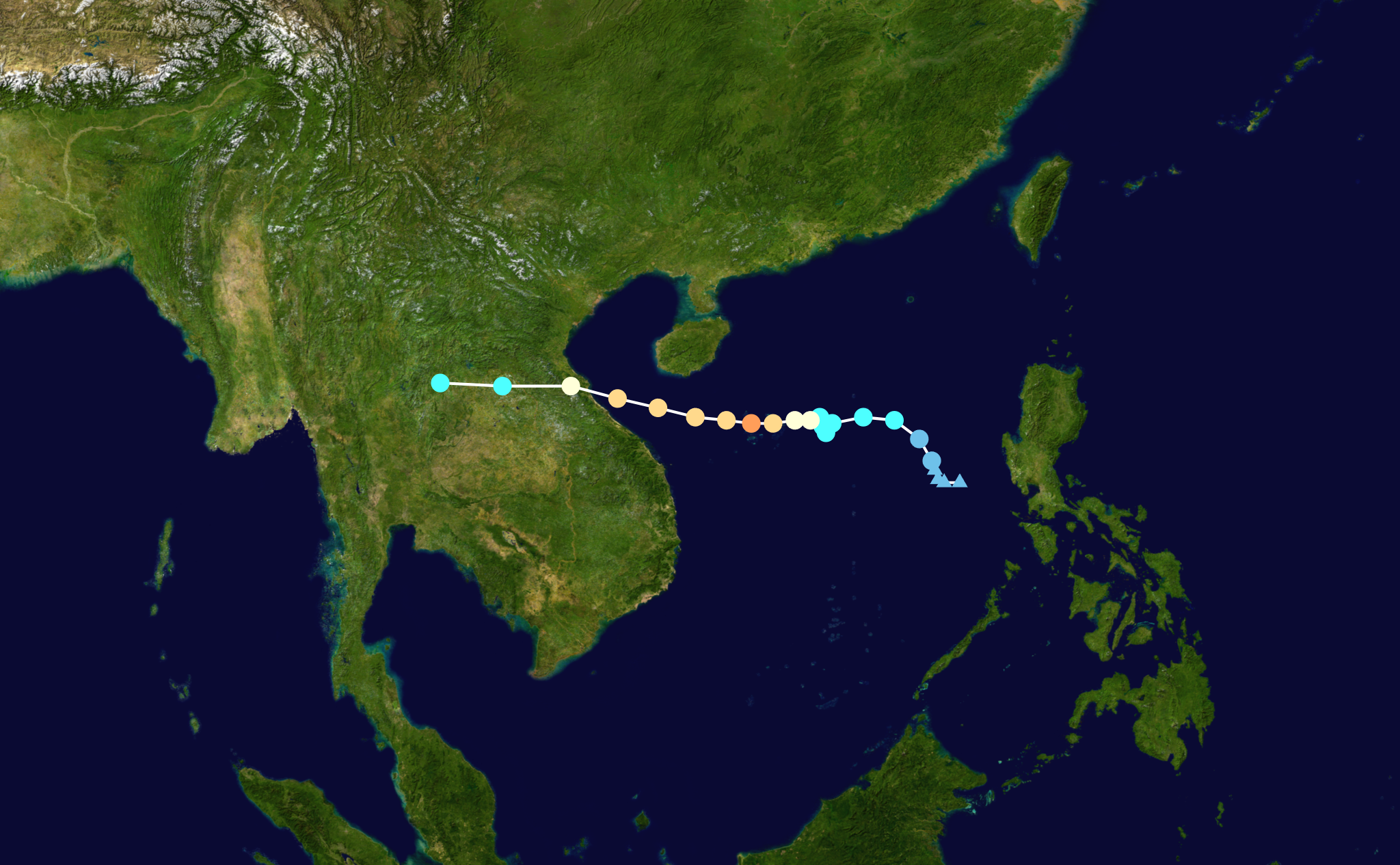
- Duration: September 25 – October 1
- Peak intensity: 120 km/h (75 mph) (10-min); 965 hPa (mbar)

A tropical disturbance formed from the southwest monsoon which was enhanced by Pabuk on September 23. On September 25, it became a tropical depression and slowly deepened off the west coast of the Philippines and named it Paolo by the PAGASA and classified as 20W by the JTWC early the next day. The system tracked west and strengthened into a tropical storm and named it Wutip on September 27 as it brought rainfall across Luzon. Tropical Storm Wutip became a severe tropical storm as it moved westwards on September 28, and rapidly became a typhoon. On September 29, Wutip became a Moderate Typhoon as it created an eye towards Thailand. It was rapidly downgraded by a tropical storm as it moved westwards on September 30. It slowly dissipated and crossed the 100th meridian very early on October 2.

As of September 29, 74 Chinese fishermen were missing after the storm sunk 3 fishing boats in the South China Sea near the Paracel Islands as Thailand and Vietnam braced for torrential rain and flooding. Fourteen survivors had been rescued. Rain reached Vietnam on September 30 and then Thailand the following day, killing 42 people in Vietnam. Wutip killed 77 people in southeastern Asia during late September and early October.

=== Tropical Storm Sepat ===
- Tropical storm (JMA)
- Tropical storm (SSHWS)
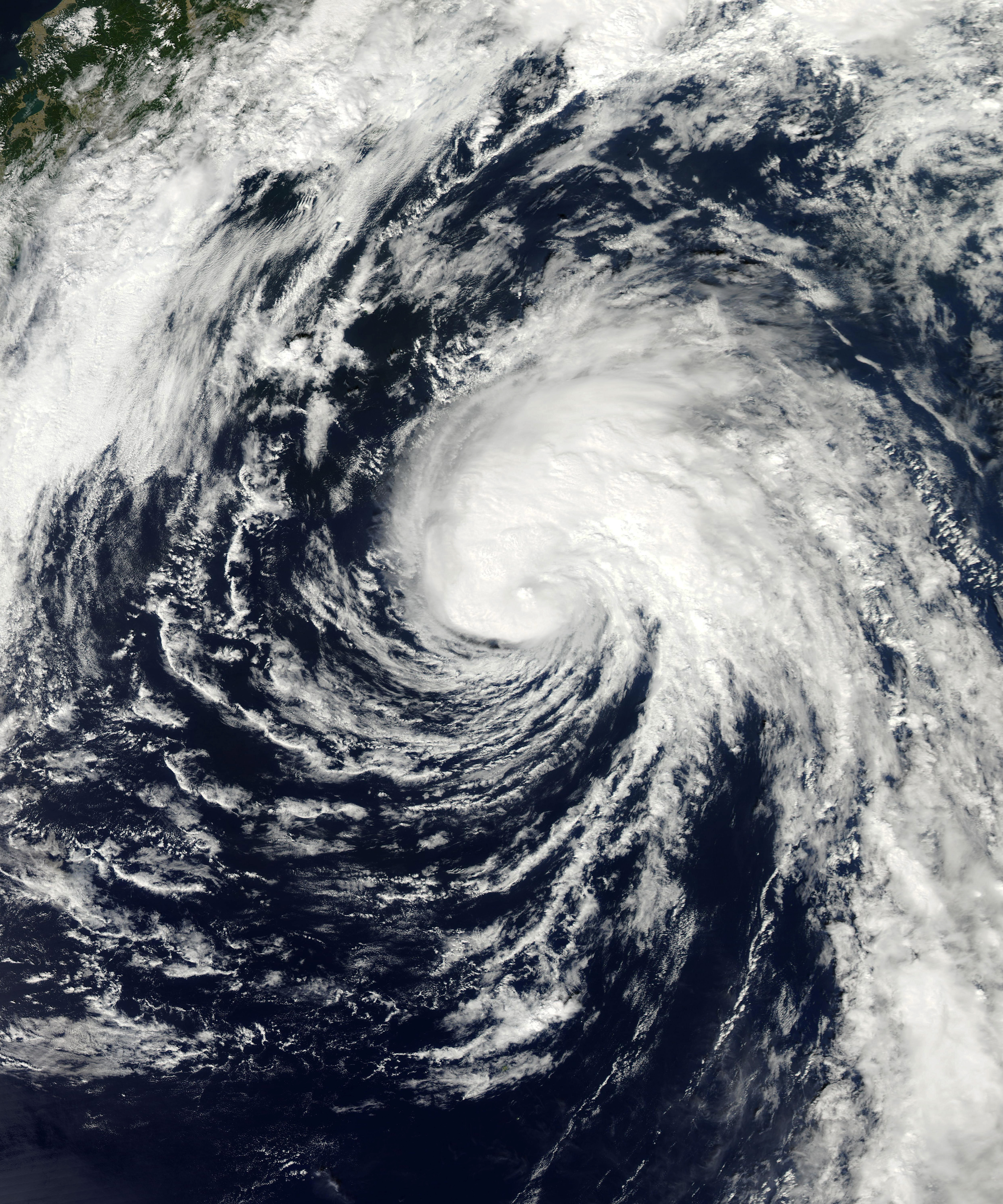
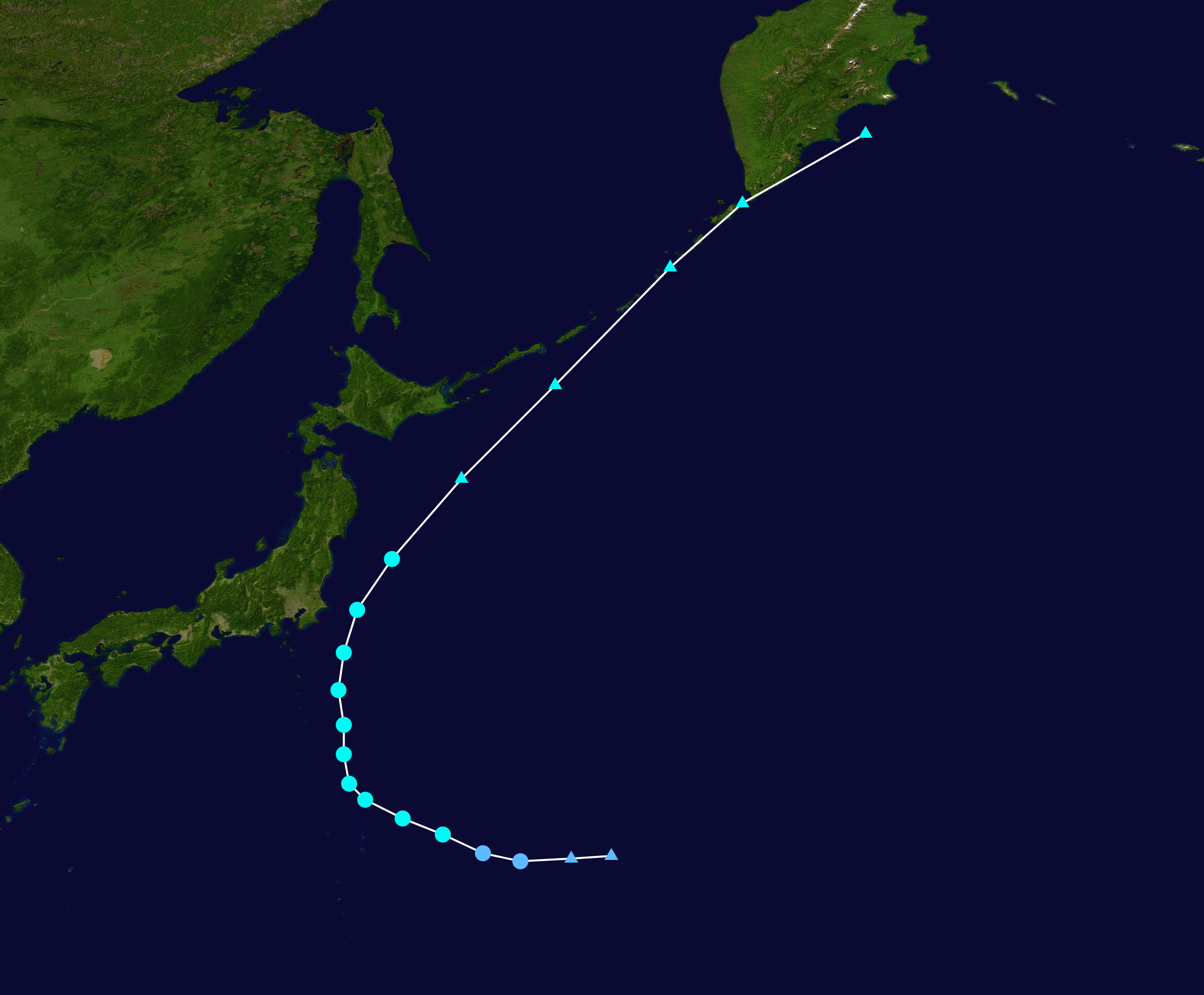
- Duration: September 29 – October 2
- Peak intensity: 75 km/h (45 mph) (10-min); 992 hPa (mbar)

A very weak low-pressure area formed on September 27. During September 28, the JTWC started to monitor and classified it as a subtropical system under strong wind shear about 2,270 km (1,410 mi) to the southeast of Tokyo, Japan. After transitioning into a tropical cyclone, the JMA reported that the system had become a tropical depression during the next day. After consolidating, the JMA reported that the system had become a tropical storm early on September 30. The JTWC subsequently designated the system as Tropical Depression 21W later that day, as they initiated advisories on the system. It impacted Japan on October 2 without any damages and casualties. Tropical Storm Sepat entered cool waters later that day and became extratropical.

=== Typhoon Fitow (Quedan) ===
- Typhoon (JMA)
- Category 2 typhoon (SSHWS)
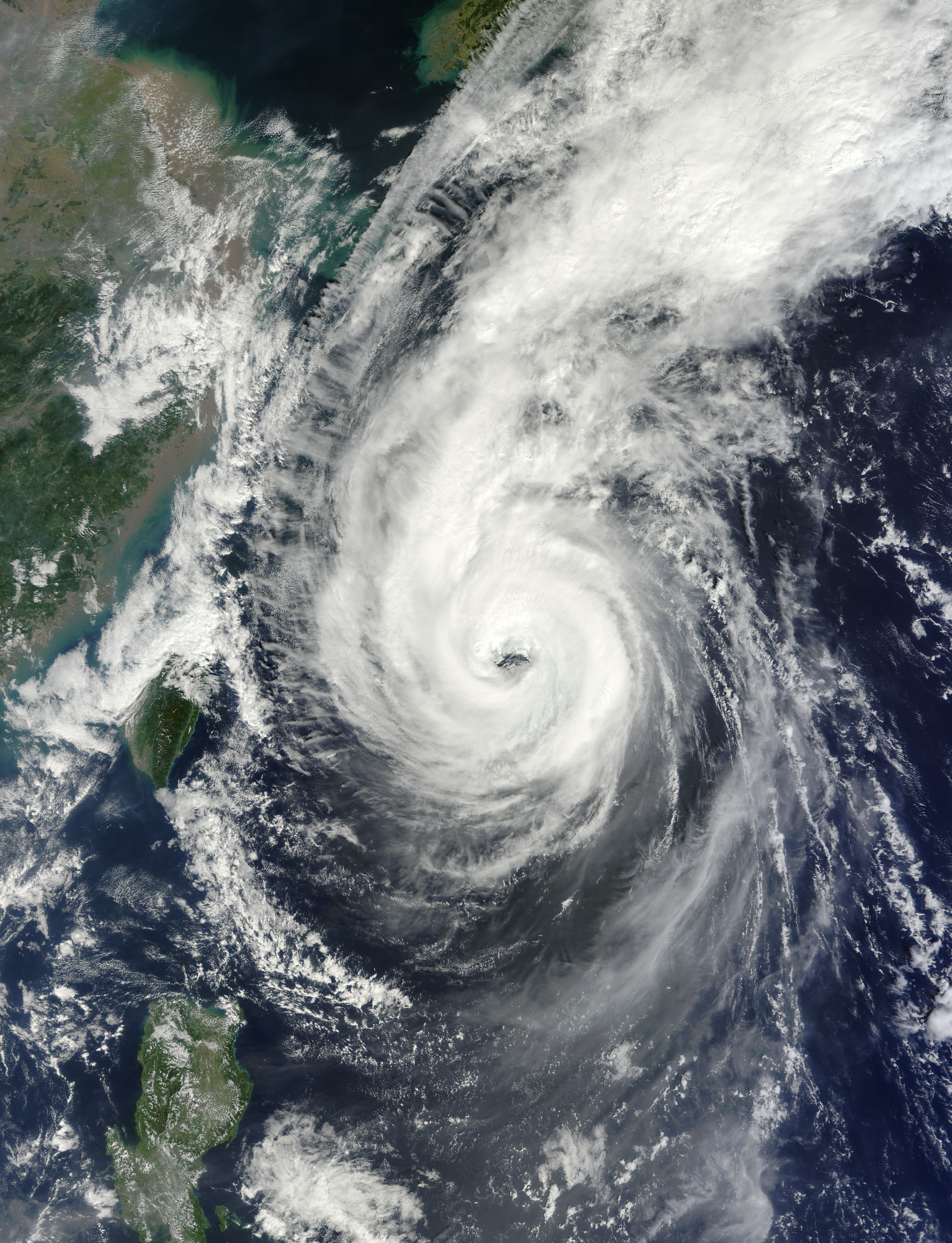
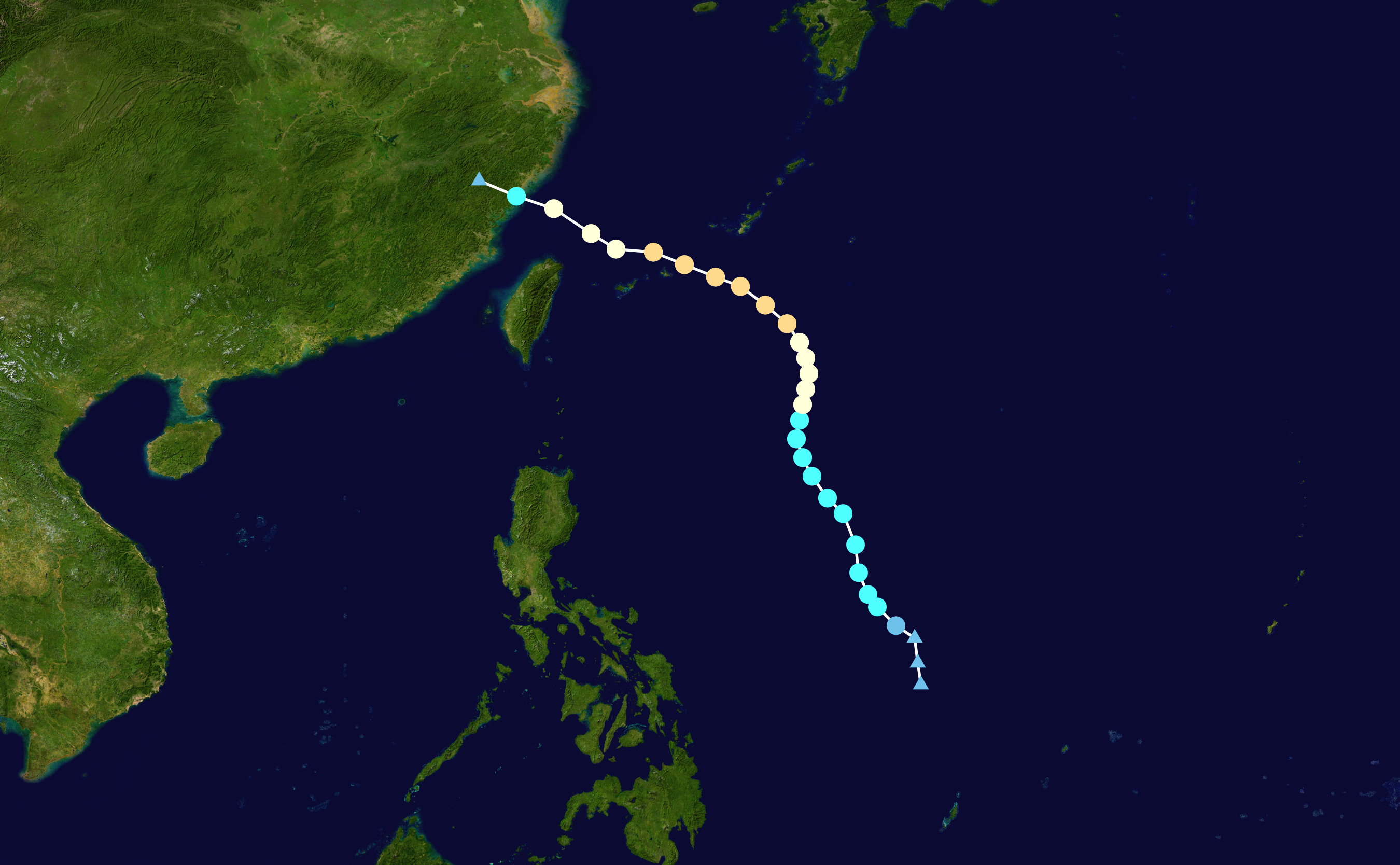
- Duration: September 29 – October 7
- Peak intensity: 140 km/h (85 mph) (10-min); 960 hPa (mbar)

A large tropical disturbance formed east of Palau late on September 26. It intensified to a tropical depression on September 29, and the PAGASA named it Quedan and JTWC designated it with 22W later that day. On September 30, deep convection wrapped around Quedan as it became a tropical storm, and it was named Fitow on October 1. Fitow rapidly intensified into a Category 2 typhoon as it moved north on October 3. A large eye developed as Fitow slammed into the southern Japanese Islands late on October 4, killing two people. Chinese authorities recalled some 65,000 fishing boats as 200 km/h (120 mph) wind gusts battered Wenzhou. 574,000 people were evacuated from Zhejiang and 177,000 from Fujian.

70% of downtown Yuyao was flooded, which led to damage valued at over 20 billion yuan as well as riots and action by riot police.

Chinese authorities reported one person killed in Wenzhou and two dock workers missing.

=== Typhoon Danas (Ramil) ===
- Very strong typhoon (JMA)
- Category 4 typhoon (SSHWS)
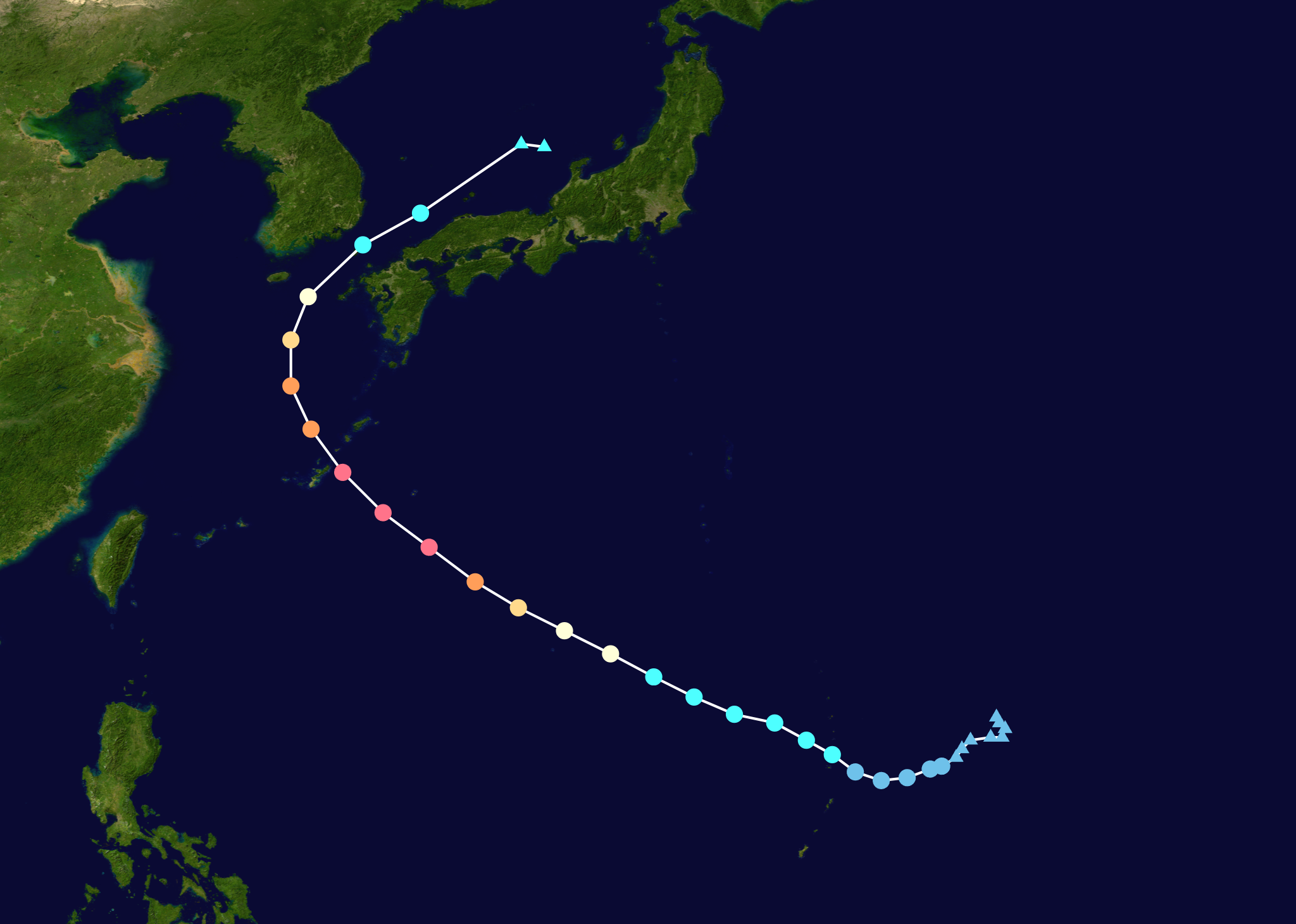
- Duration: October 1 – October 9
- Peak intensity: 165 km/h (105 mph) (10-min); 935 hPa (mbar)

On October 1, the JMA reported that a tropical depression had developed within an area of moderate vertical windshear, about 900 km (560 mi) to the northeast of Hagåtña, Guam. Over the next 2 days the system gradually developed further as the low level circulation consolidated and became better defined, before the JTWC initiated advisories and designated the system as Tropical Depression 23W during October 3. During the next day both the JTWC and the JMA reported that the depression had developed into a tropical storm with the latter naming it as Danas. On October 5, Danas became a severe tropical storm and rapidly became a Category 1 typhoon as it races west towards warm waters.

Late on the same day, some agencies reported that it would reach Category 5 strength because of explosive intensification occurring as more convection wraps the storm. Early on October 6, Typhoon Danas was classified as a Category 2-3 typhoon as a small eye developed as the PAGASA gave it the name Ramil as it passed through the corner of the Philippine area of responsibility later that day as a strong Category 3 typhoon. Typhoon Danas underwent explosive intensification as it steadily and slowly enters warm waters and it became a Category 4 typhoon. Its eye became wider and was classified as an annular typhoon and impacted the Ryukyu Islands on October 7. Typhoon Danas then rapidly weakened as it entered cool waters near Japan on October 8, and on October 9, Danas became extratropical as it headed toward the northern part of Japan. Its remnants continued to be a low-pressure area and entered southern Alaska and Canada on October 13.

Damage in Jeju Island were at KRW245 million (US$228,000).

=== Typhoon Nari (Santi) ===
- Typhoon (JMA)
- Category 3 typhoon (SSHWS)
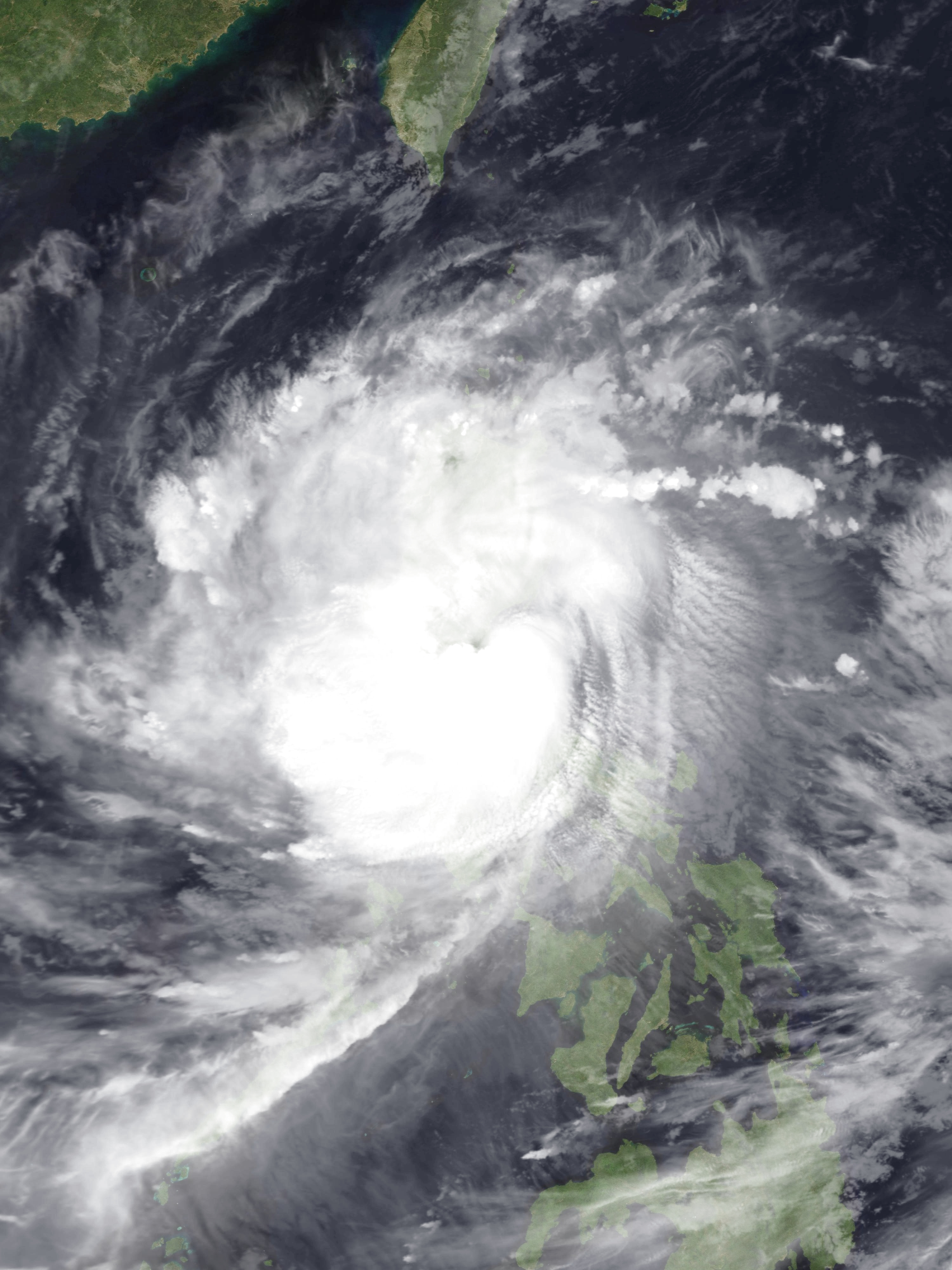
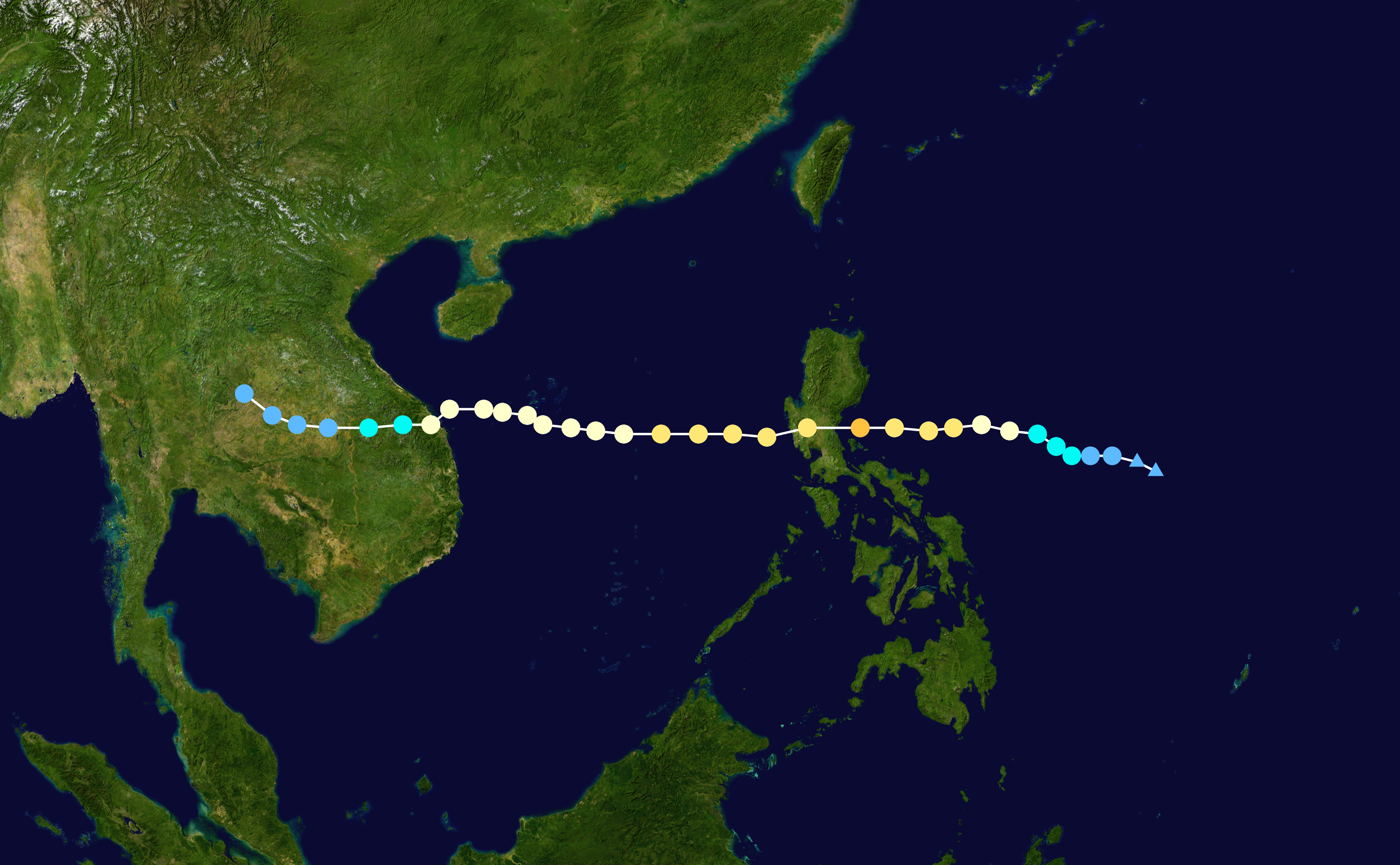
- Duration: October 8 – October 16
- Peak intensity: 140 km/h (85 mph) (10-min); 965 hPa (mbar)

On October 8, the JMA started to monitor a tropical depression, that developed within an area of low to moderate vertical windshear, about 1,350 km (840 mi) to the west of Manila on the Philippine island of Luzon. During that day the system moved westwards along the southern edge of a subtropical ridge of high pressure, as it gradually developed further, before it was named Santi by PAGASA. It gradually intensified into a tropical storm, gaining the international name Nari on October 9. Nari continued to intensify, and reached Category 3 status on October 11 as it moved west towards the Philippines and made landfall in Dingalan, Aurora. Power outages affected much of Central Luzon as the typhoon crossed the region. Five people were killed by falling trees and landslides from Nari as it weakened to a Category 2 typhoon on October 12. With land interaction, Nari weakened to a Severe Tropical Storm during October 13. Late on October 14, the system affected Vietnam and made landfall later that day. Due to land interaction, Nari weakened to an remnant low. Early on October 16, both the JMA and JTWC issued their final warnings on Nari, as the system dissipated. Within the Philippines a total of 15 people were left dead while 5 were missing, while total economic losses were amounted to be Php 12.3 billion (US$277.34 million).

=== Typhoon Wipha (Tino) ===
- Very strong typhoon (JMA)
- Category 4 typhoon (SSHWS)
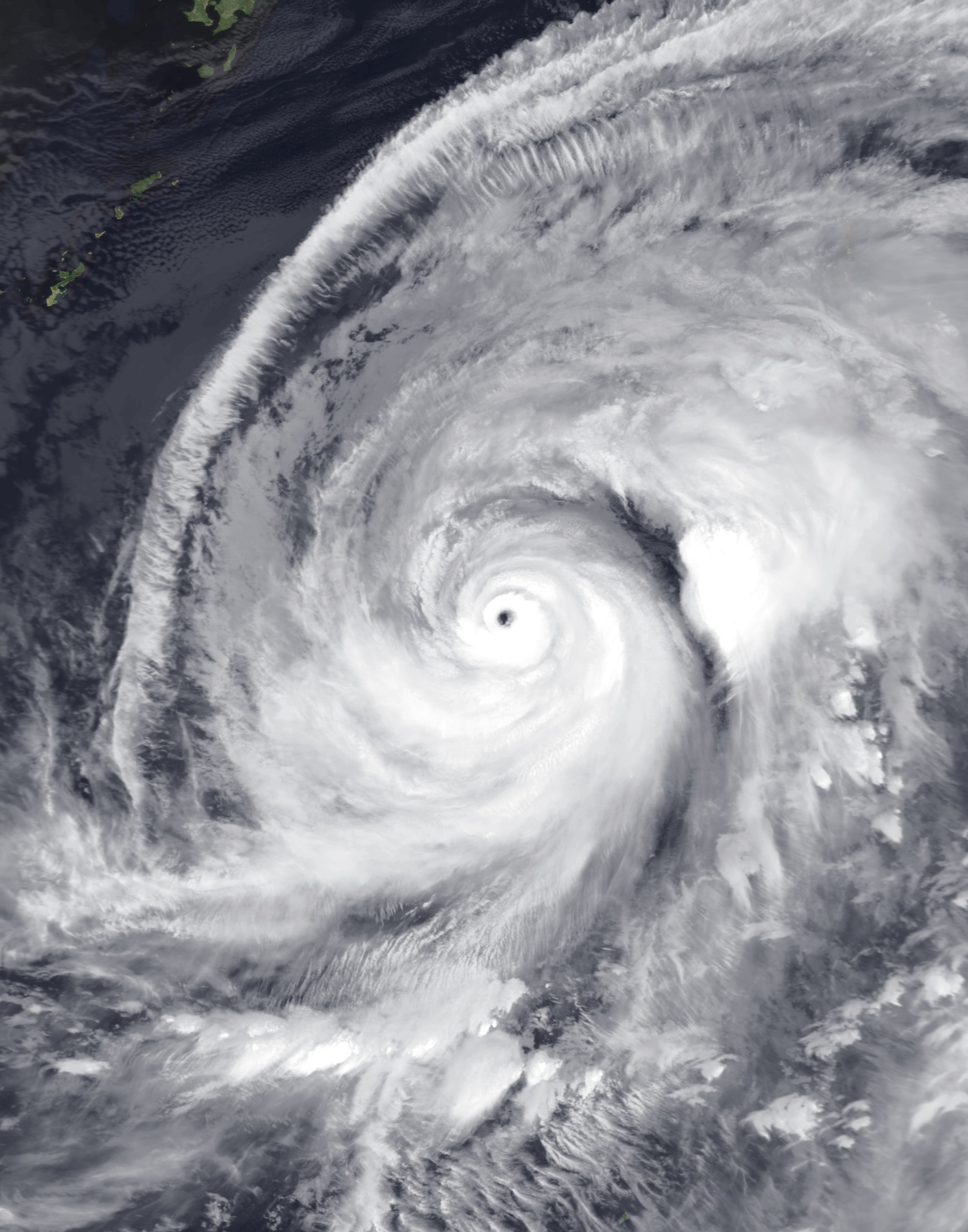
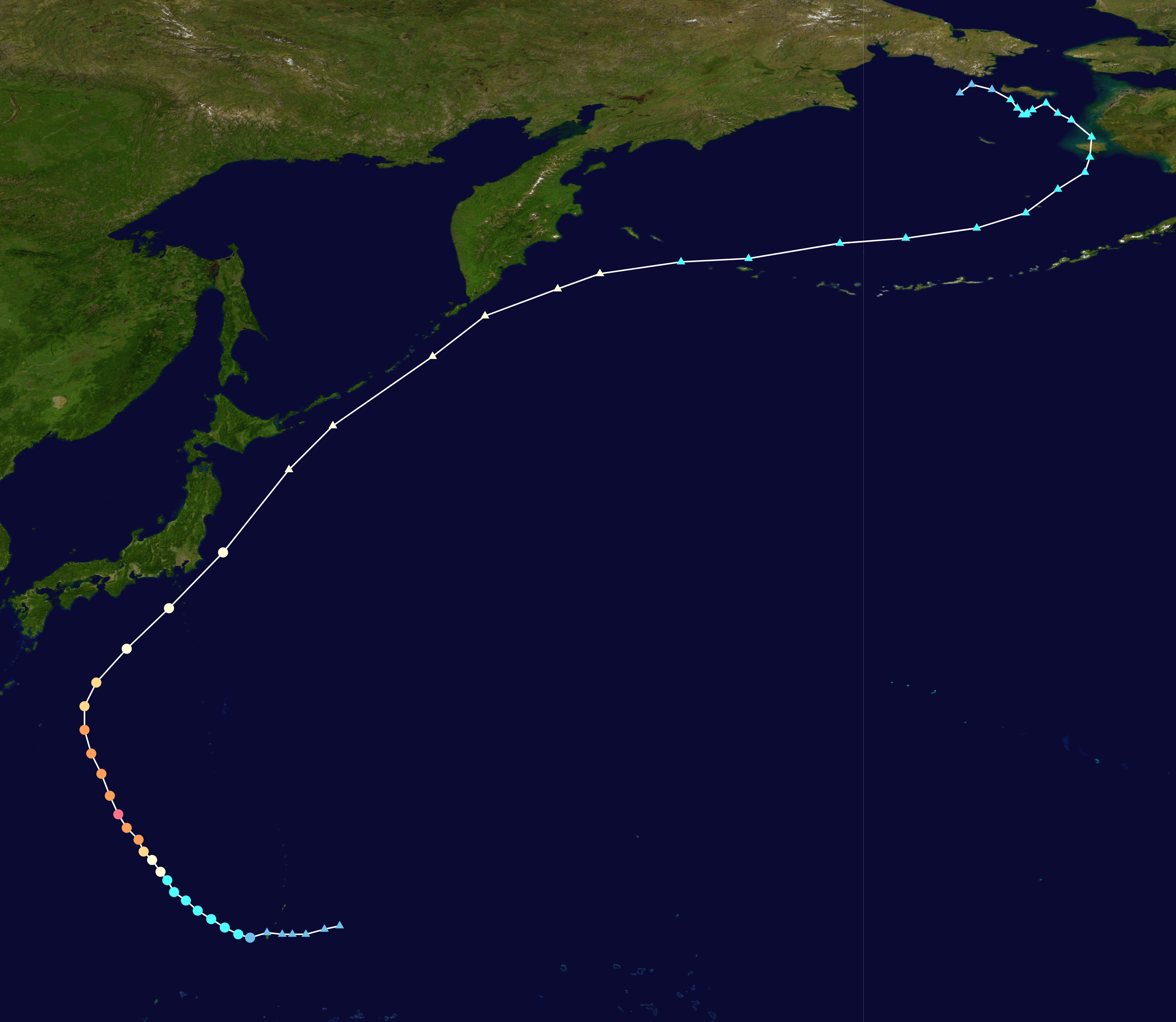
- Duration: October 9 – October 16
- Peak intensity: 165 km/h (105 mph) (10-min); 930 hPa (mbar)

On October 8, 2013, the JMA started to monitor a tropical depression, that developed within an area of low to moderate vertical windshear, about 670 km (415 mi) to the east of Hagåtña on the island of Guam. Tropical Depression 25W formed 696 nautical miles south of Iwo Jima, Japan on October 10. It strengthened into Tropical Storm Wipha, then continued to intensify into a severe tropical storm and later a typhoon. Wipha then rapidly intensified into a Category 4 typhoon on October 13. During the morning of October 14, Wipha entered the Philippine area of responsibility, and PAGASA promptly named it Tino as it created an eyewall replacement cycle becoming a Category 4 typhoon later that day. Early on October 15, Wipha rapidly weakened as it approached cooler waters near Japan. Late on October 16, Wipha transitioned into an extratropical storm. The remnants of Wipha continued to accelerate towards the northeast, and was located southeast of the Kamchatka Peninsula on October 17. Soon afterwards, Wipha turned to the east, and crossed the International Date Line on October 18.

=== Typhoon Francisco (Urduja) ===
- Violent typhoon (JMA)
- Category 5 super typhoon (SSHWS)
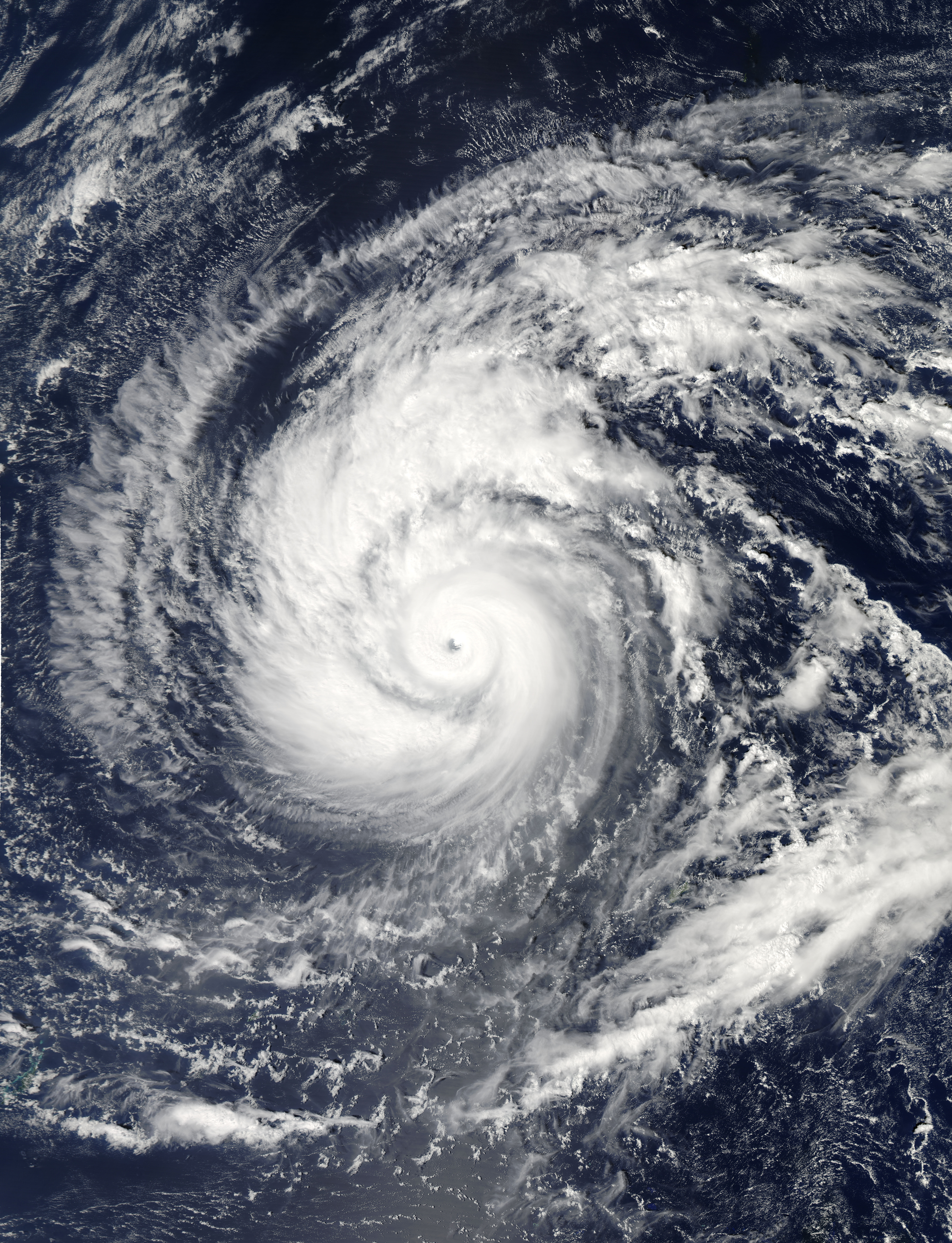
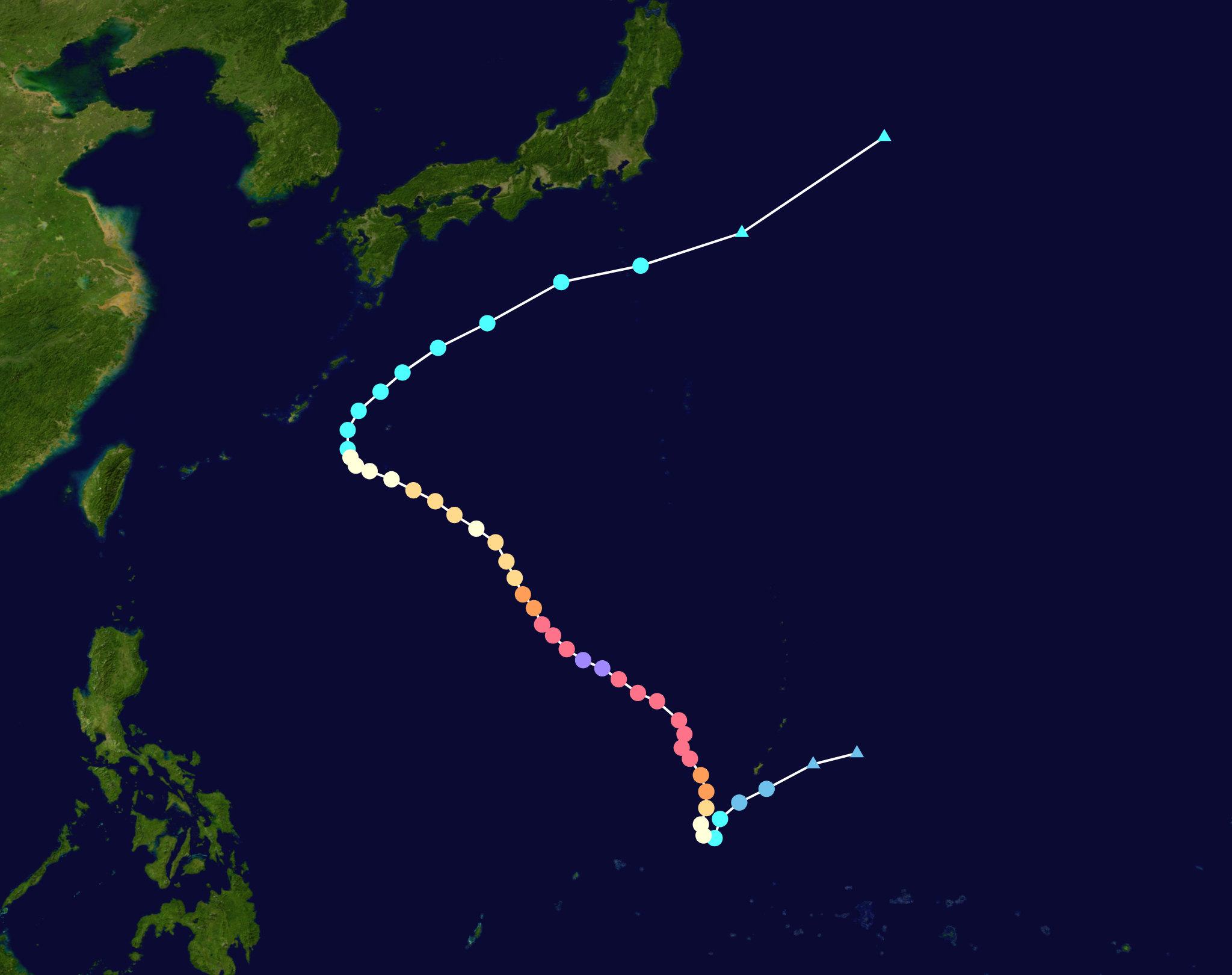
- Duration: October 15 – October 26
- Peak intensity: 195 km/h (120 mph) (10-min); 920 hPa (mbar)

On October 15, the JMA reported that a tropical depression had developed about 465 km (290 mi) to the northeast of Hagåtña, Guam. During that day the depression gradually developed further before later that day the JTWC designated it as Tropical Depression 26W. It was subsequently named Francisco by the JMA as it very rapidly became a severe tropical storm early on October 17. Explosive intensification occurred, and Francisco evolved to a Category 5 super typhoon late on October 19 and reached peak intensity early later that day. Francisco slowly weakened as it underwent an eyewall replacement cycle. At noon on October 21, Francisco rapidly weakened to a Category 3 typhoon and became an annular typhoon. Very early on October 22, Francisco entered the Philippine area of responsibility and it was given the name Urduja, as convection around Francisco started to weaken later that day. On October 23, Francisco was downgraded to a severe tropical storm as it impacted the Ryukyu Islands. On October 26, Francisco impacted Japan as a tropical storm. It then rapidly dissipated southeast of Japan also interacting with extratropical storm Lekima the same day.

=== Tropical Depression 27W ===
- Tropical depression (JMA)
- Tropical depression (SSHWS)
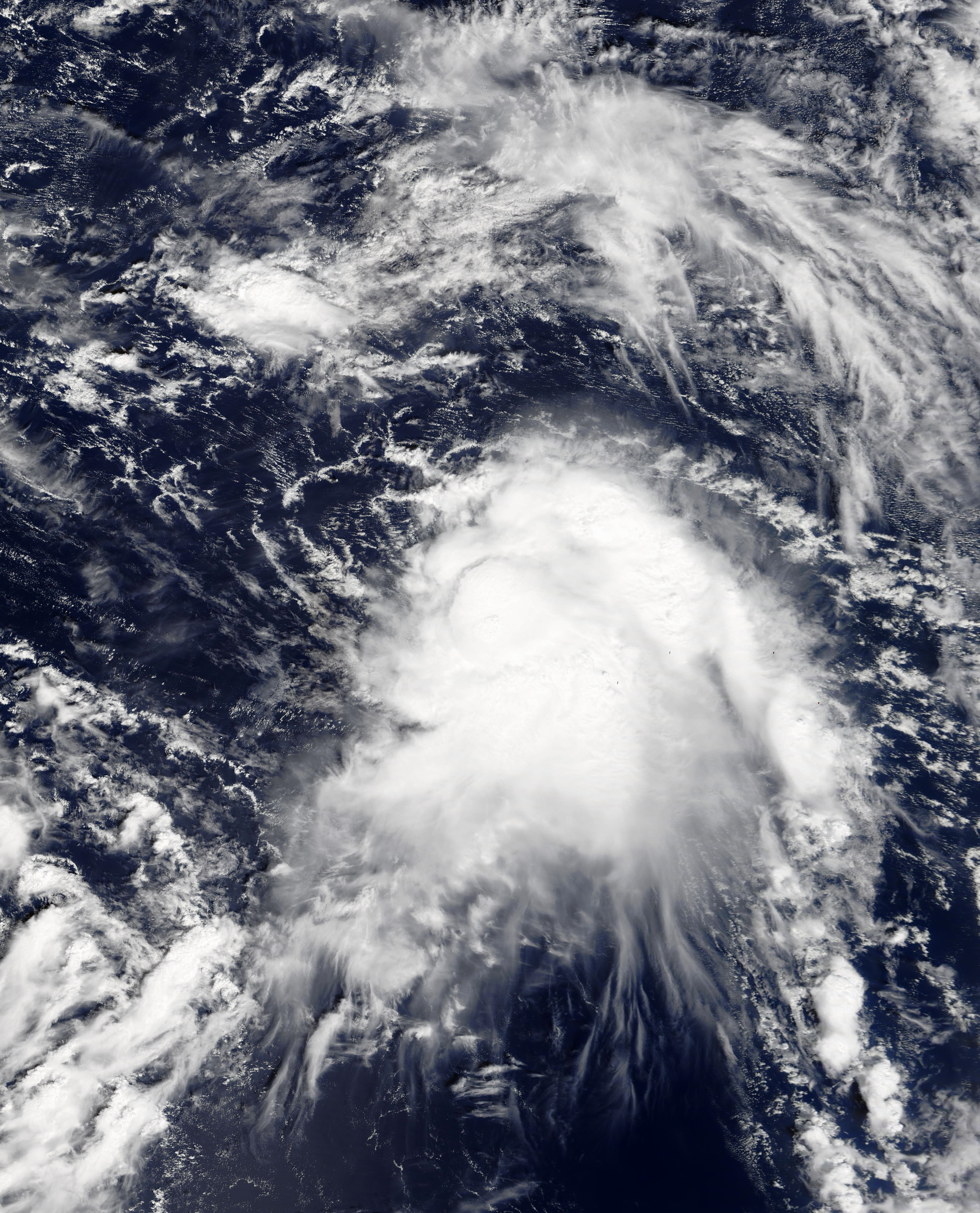
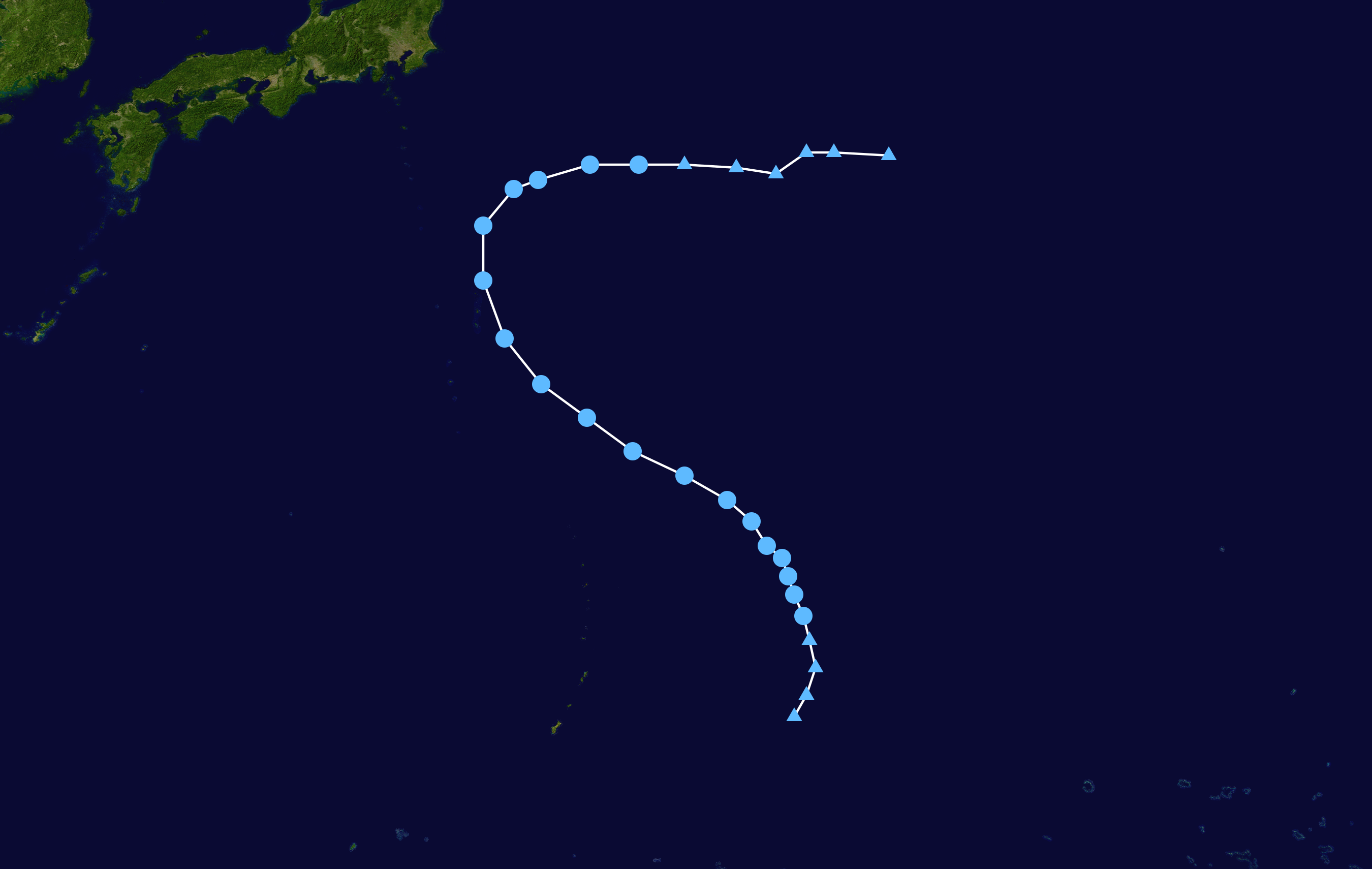
- Duration: October 17 – October 22
- Peak intensity: 55 km/h (35 mph) (10-min); 1002 hPa (mbar)

Early on October 17, a tropical depression developed about 900 km (560 mi) northeast of Guam. The system gradually developed further within an area of moderate windshear that was off-set by an outflow mechanism, and early on October 19, the JTWC designated it as Tropical Depression 27W. During that day, the system moved northeastwards within an area of strong wind shear, along the southwestern edge of the subtropical ridge. The JTWC issued their final advisory on the system early on October 20, after convection diminished. The system was last noted by the JMA on October 23 southeast of Tokyo, Japan.

=== Typhoon Lekima ===
- Violent typhoon (JMA)
- Category 5 super typhoon (SSHWS)
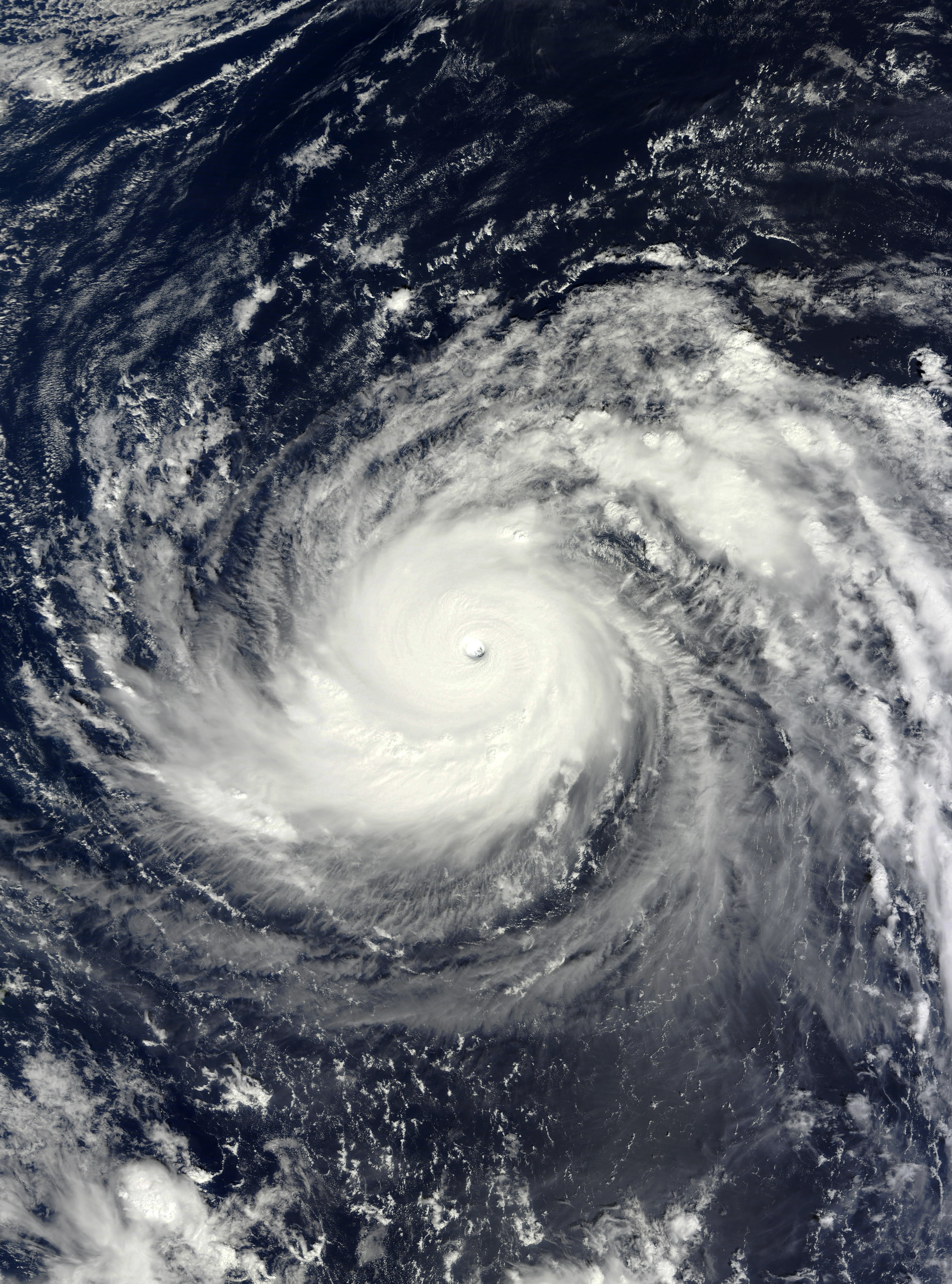
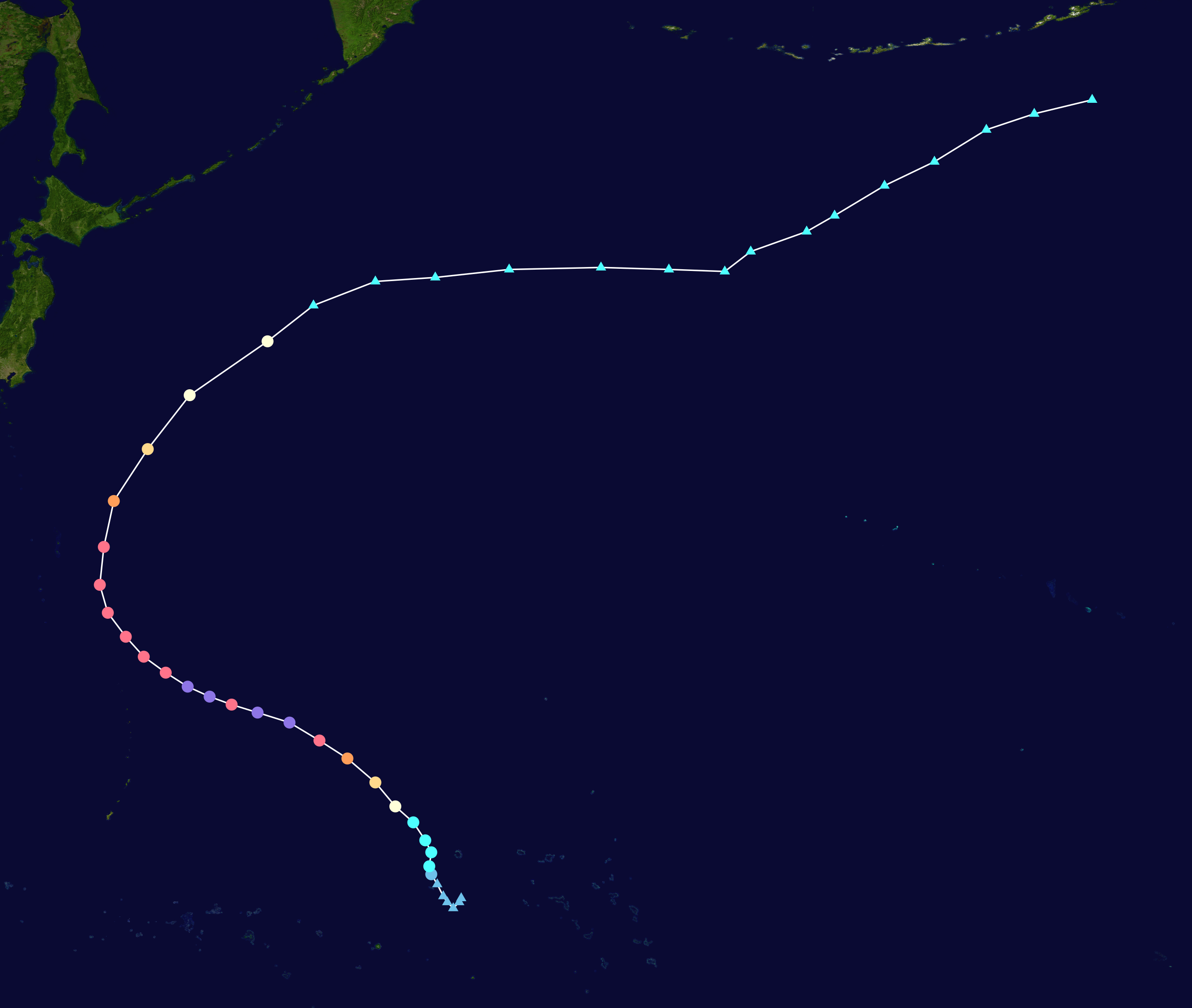
- Duration: October 19 – October 26
- Peak intensity: 215 km/h (130 mph) (10-min); 905 hPa (mbar)

Early on October 19, the Japan Meteorological Agency (JMA) reported that a tropical depression had developed, within an area of strong vertical windshear, about 730 km (455 mi) to the northeast of the Micronesian island of Pohnpei. During that day as the system moved slowly westwards, upper level divergence helped to offset the vertical windshear and enhanced the atmospheric convection surrounding the system. As a result of this increase in convection and a consolidating low level circulation centre, the United States Joint Typhoon Warning Center issued a tropical cyclone formation alert on the system later that day. During October 20, the system continued to develop as it moved around the outer edge of a low level reflection of the subtropical ridge of high pressure. Later that day the JTWC initiated advisories on the system and designated it as Tropical Depression 22W, before the JMA named the system Lekima at 1800 UTC after it had developed into a tropical storm. Early on October 21, JMA upgraded Lekima to a severe tropical storm. Although a weak trough east of the cyclone was causing subsidence, vigorous eastward and equatorward outflow were helping sustain the convection. Late on the same day, JTWC upgraded Lekima to a typhoon.

After JMA upgraded Lekima to a typhoon early on October 22, the system began to undergo rapid deepening, developing a well-defined eye with a symmetric eyewall and further improved deep convective banding owing to weak vertical wind shear and radial outflow. When Lekima was tracking along the southwestern periphery of a deep-layered subtropical ridge late on the same day, JTWC upgraded the system to a super typhoon with category 5 strength on the Saffir–Simpson hurricane wind scale, as an anticyclone was providing very favourable dual-channel outflow. Early on October 23, JMA reported that Typhoon Lekima had reached peak intensity, with 10-minute maximum sustained winds at 115 knots (215 km/h, 130 mph) and atmospheric pressure at 905 hPa (26.7 inHg). Since then, the typhoon has maintained its peak intensity for over one day, with a larger and sharply defined eye surrounded by a thick eyewall of deep convection. However, morphed integrated microwave imageries at CIMSS (MIMIC) depict that Lekima underwent an eyewall replacement cycle late on October 23 and completed it one day later.

As Lekima began to approach mid-latitude westerlies and stronger vertical wind shear, JMA reported that the typhoon north of the Northern Mariana Islands started to slowly weaken at noon on October 24, yet JTWC analysed it had weakened earlier. JTWC best track data indicated that Lekima weakened into a typhoon at noon, for elongation becoming evident along the northern flank. On October 25, when Lekima was located east of the Bonin Islands, it crested the western periphery of the subtropical ridge and was poised to accelerate northeastwards. Meanwhile, a point source anticyclone continued to provide favorable radial outflow, but convection became more shallow over the system. Under moderate to strong westerly vertical wind shear and interacting with the mid-latitude westerlies in the afternoon, Lekima began extratropical transition; as the result, the typhoon lost the eyewall structure, but it still maintained tightly curved banding wrapping into a well-defined centre.

=== Typhoon Krosa (Vinta) ===
- Typhoon (JMA)
- Category 3 typhoon (SSHWS)
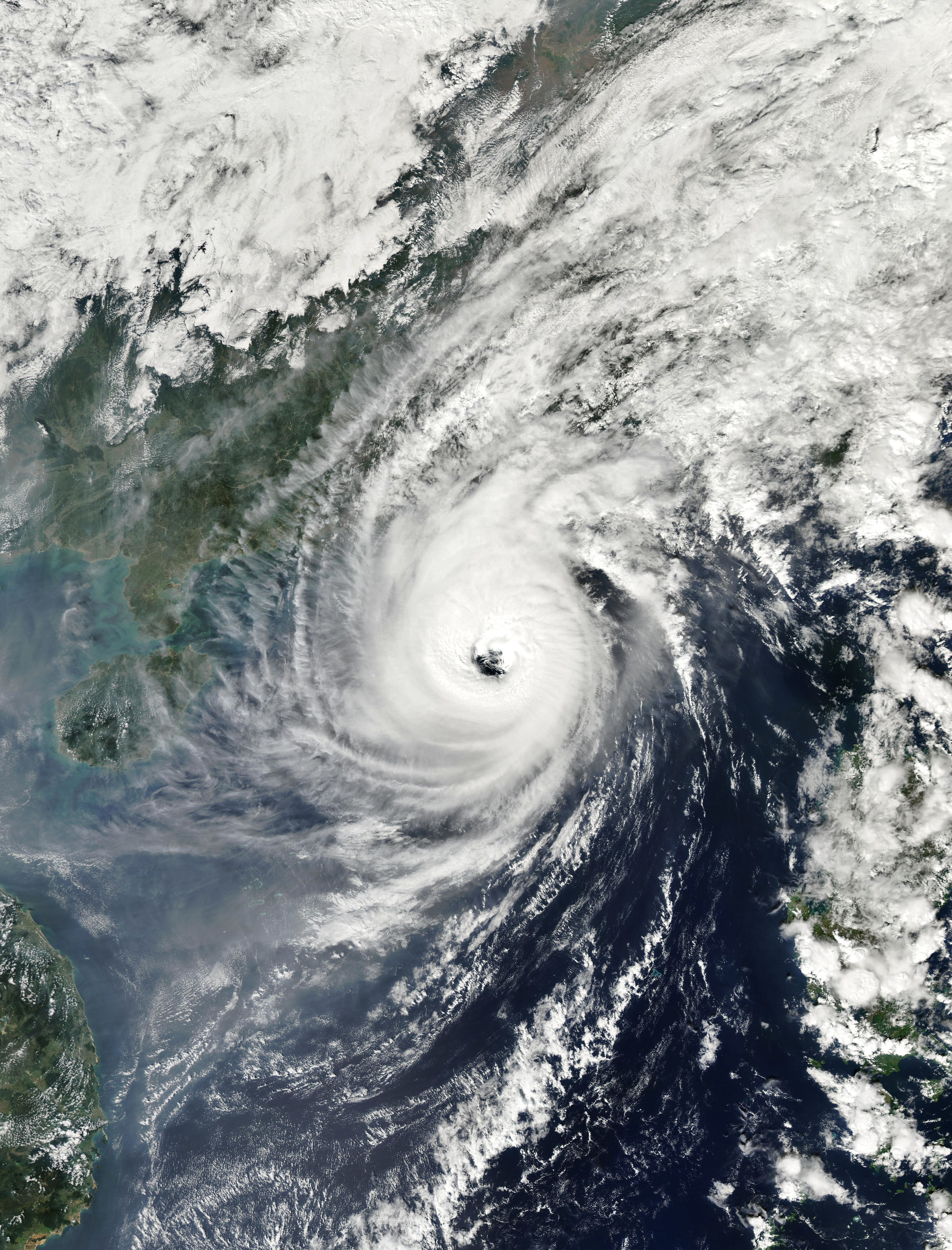
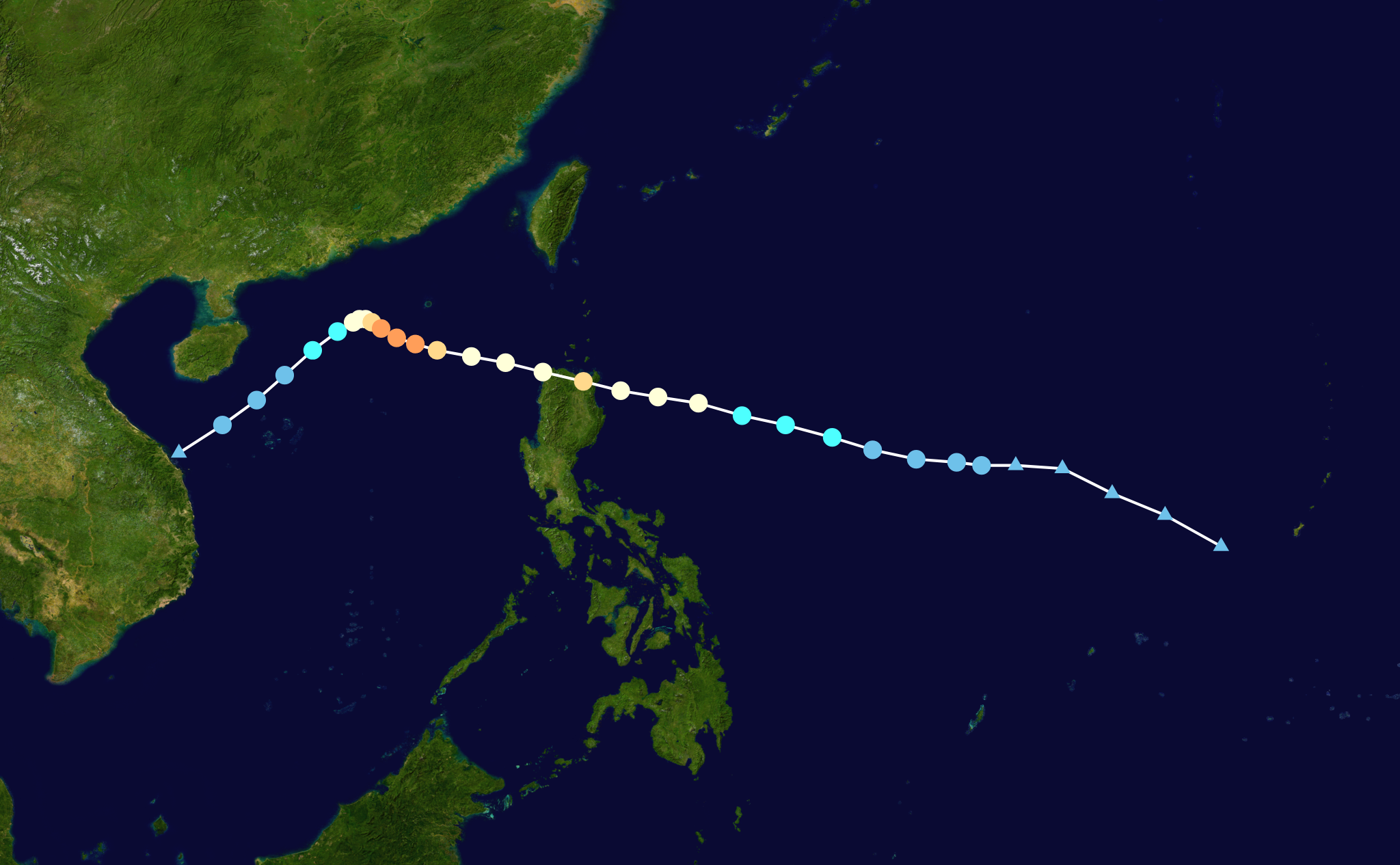
- Duration: October 27 – November 5
- Peak intensity: 140 km/h (85 mph) (10-min); 970 hPa (mbar)

A non-tropical system formed late on October 23. It became a low-pressure area on October 26. On October 27, the JMA started to classify it as a tropical depression that had developed within a moderately favourable environment for further development, about 380 km (235 mi) to the southeast of Hagåtña, Guam. On October 28, the system was given the designation 29W by the JTWC and named Vinta by the PAGASA. It became Tropical Storm Krosa by the JMA as it slowly intensified nearing the Philippines early on October 30. The next day, Krosa reached Category 1 typhoon intensity. Later that morning, the typhoon made landfall over Santa Ana, Cagayan. The typhoon intensified into a Category 2 typhoon soon after its Cagayan landfall. It is reported that 1 person died by heavy floods. On November 1, Krosa weakened to a Category 1 typhoon, but on early November 2, its eye expanded as it was in the South China Sea and became a Category 2 again. It maintained its strength and became a Category 3 typhoon later that day as vertical windshear occurred north of it.

Portions of the Pan-Philippine Highway were blocked, and in Lal-Lo, Cagayan, a car crashed into a gasoline truck due to power outages. Agriculture damage was estimated at ₱273 million (US$6.31 million), (Note: The total was originally reported in Philippine pesos. Total converted via the XE.com website.) occurring just before the start of the harvest. Across the island, the typhoon damaged 37,523 houses, including 3,897 that were destroyed, forcing 65,648 people to evacuate to storm shelters. Overall, Krosa killed four people in the Philippines, and left ₱277 million (US$6.4 million) in damage. After the storm, workers quickly restored power lines, while the government provided monetary assistance to storm-ravaged families, after Cagayan was declared a state of calamity. Members of the Philippine military and Department of Public Works and Highways worked to clean up following the storm.

=== Tropical Depression 30W (Wilma) ===
- Tropical depression (JMA)
- Tropical storm (SSHWS)
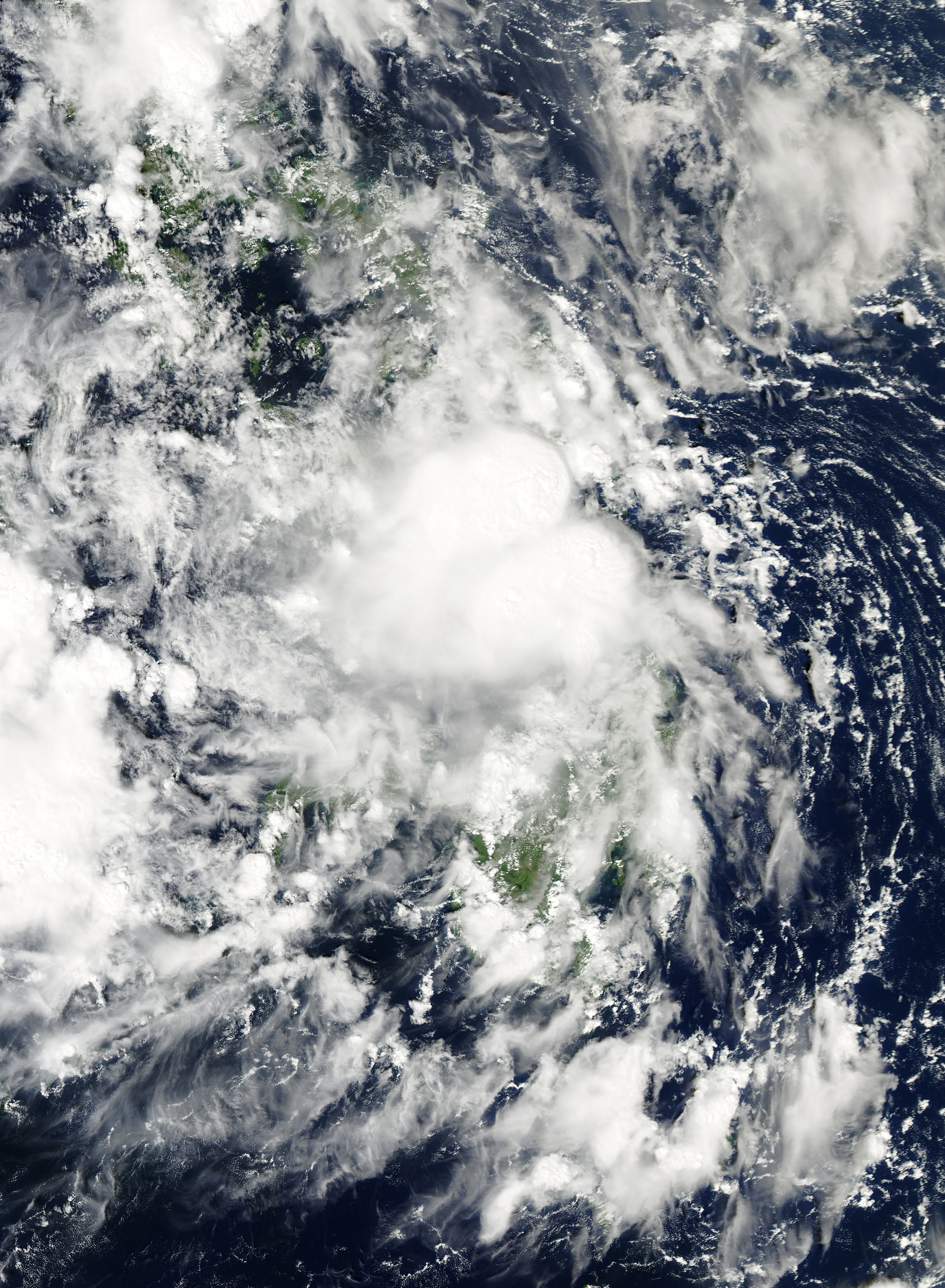
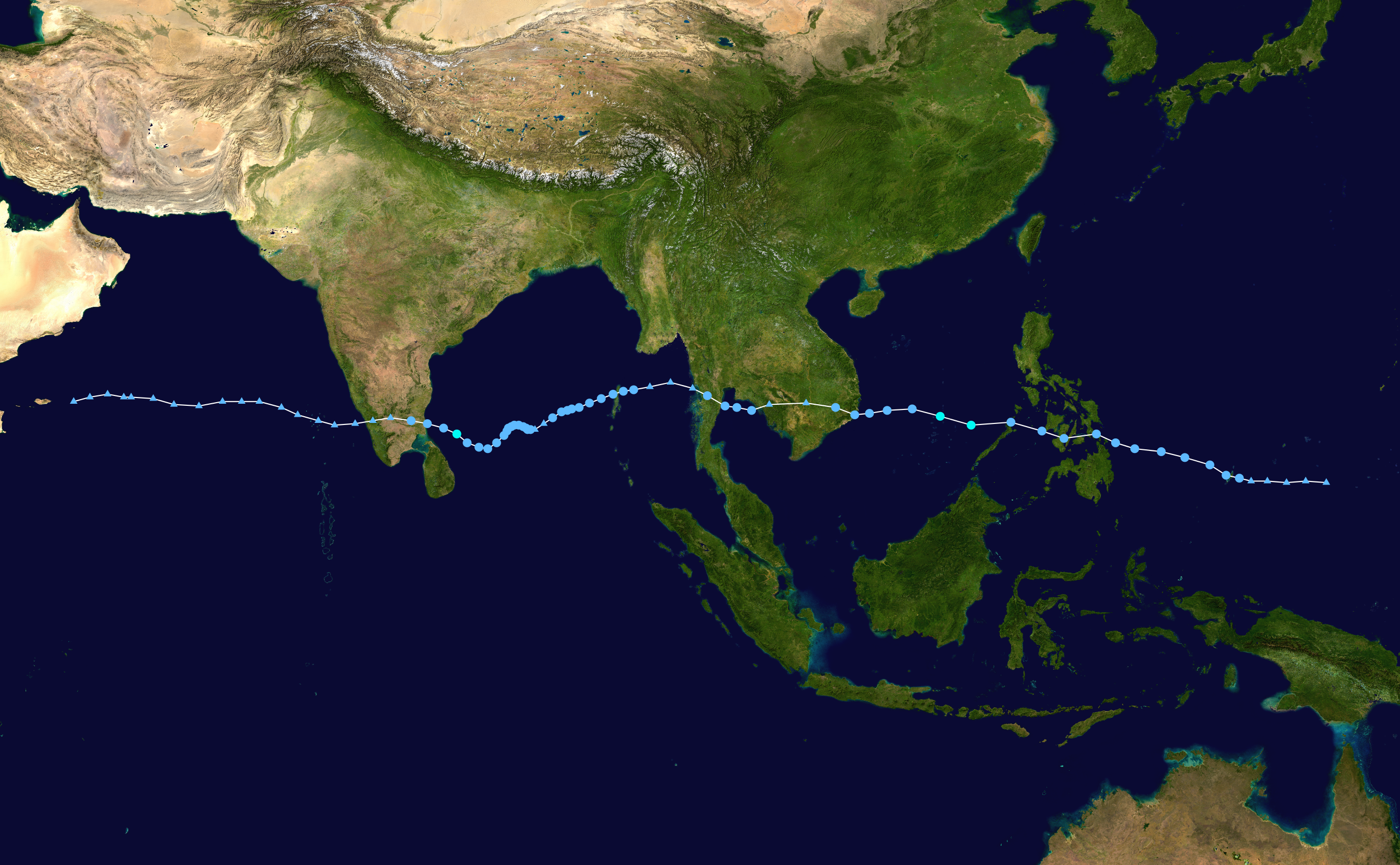
- Duration: November 2 – November 7
- Peak intensity: 55 km/h (35 mph) (10-min); 1004 hPa (mbar)

A broad circulation formed early on October 31. On November 1, the JMA reported that it was upgraded to a tropical depression that had developed, about 280 km (175 mi) to the south of Palau. On November 2, the tropical depression weakened into a low-pressure area. On November 3, the system regenerated into a tropical depression, and the JTWC issued a Tropical Cyclone Formation Alert. The storm was then given the name Wilma by the PAGASA, and the designation 30W by the JTWC, as it impacted northern Mindanao. On November 4, Wilma weakened, and spawned a waterspout that caused minor damage. On November 6, the system impacted Vietnam, before it became a remnant low late on November 7. Then on November 8, the remnants of the storm continued to move west, crossing the 100th meridian east, and affecting Myanmar. The storm crossed the Malay Peninsula into the Bay of Bengal later on the same day.

=== Typhoon Haiyan (Yolanda) ===
- Violent typhoon (JMA)
- Category 5 super typhoon (SSHWS)
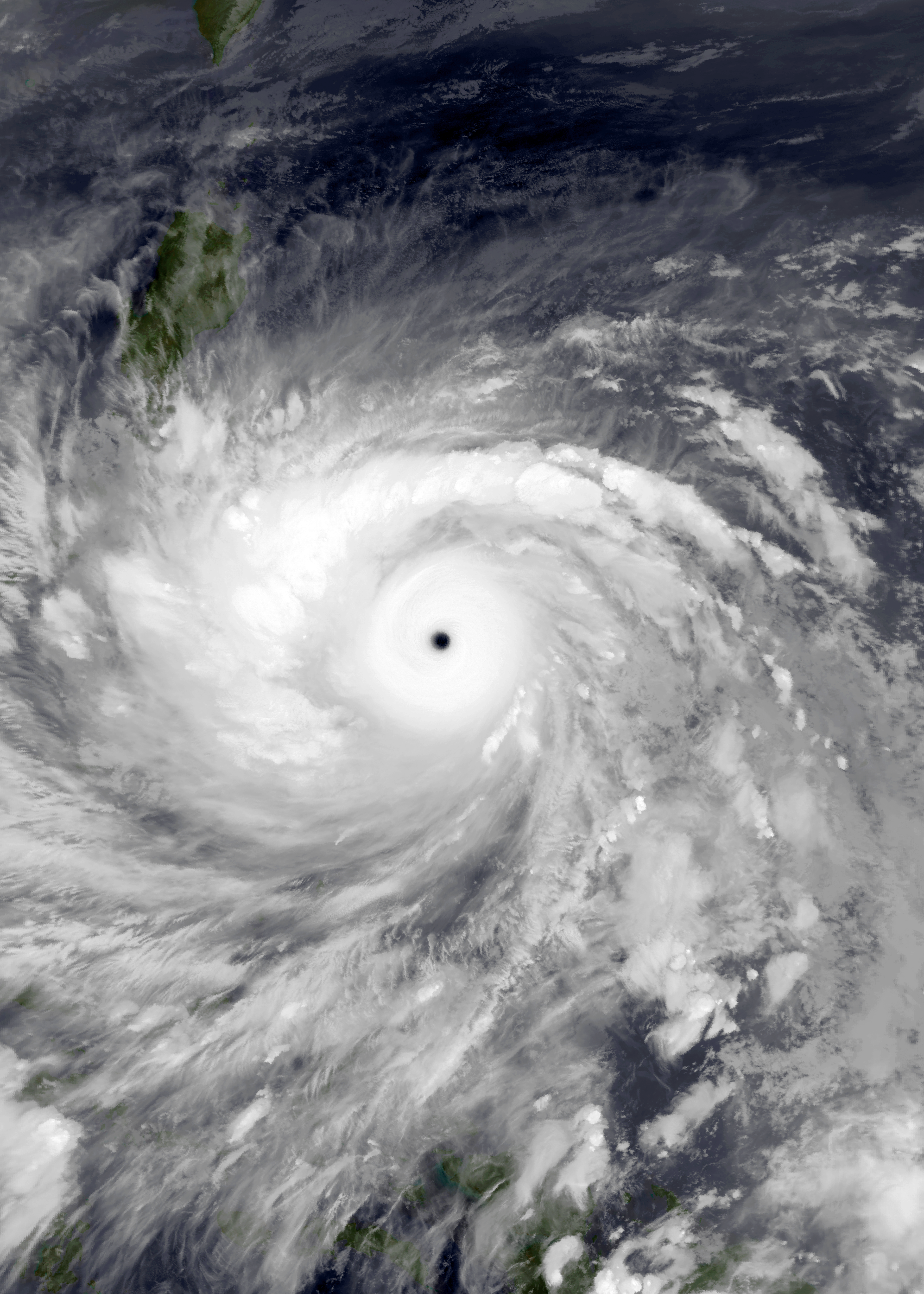
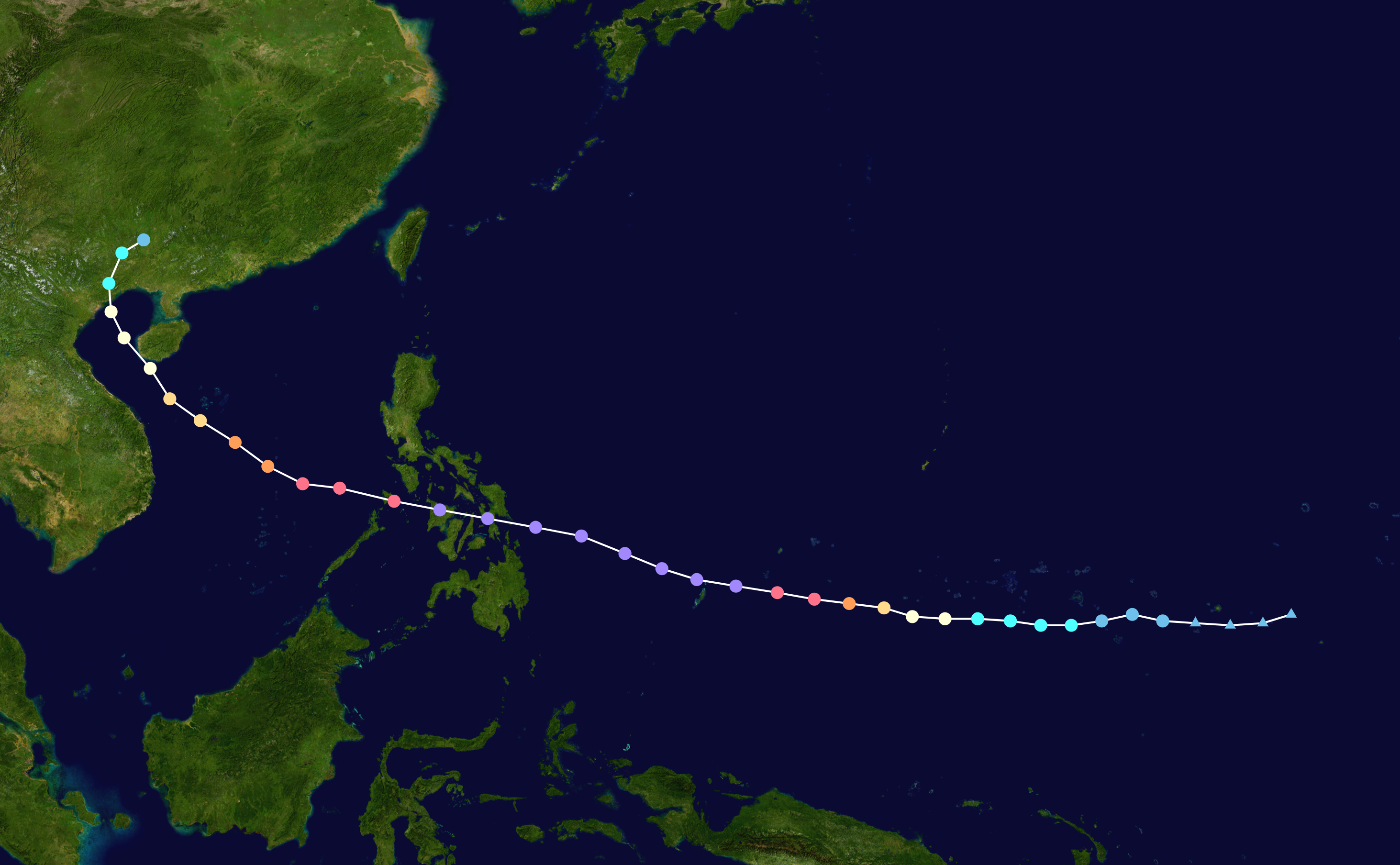
- Duration: November 3 – November 11
- Peak intensity: 230 km/h (145 mph) (10-min); 895 hPa (mbar)

On November 3, a low-pressure area formed 45 nautical miles south-southeast of Pohnpei. The Joint Typhoon Warning Center (JTWC) issued a Tropical Cyclone Formation Alert. A few hours later, the JTWC designated the depression as 31W. At 10 AM JST the next day, the JMA named 31W as Haiyan. Haiyan rapidly intensified as it headed towards Palau and the Philippines. Rapid deepening occurred and it became a Category 5 super typhoon as it entered the Philippine area of responsibility, and was named Yolanda. Haiyan reached a barometric pressure below 900 mbars (895 mbars), the first since Typhoon Megi in 2010. On November 8, Haiyan weakened to a Category 4 typhoon as it entered the South China Sea. An eyewall replacement cycle occurred to Haiyan as it became a Category 3 typhoon. On November 9, the outer rainbands of the storm were felt in Cambodia and Vietnam. It weakened to a moderate typhoon as it impacted Laos. Haiyan rapidly weakened to a severe tropical storm as it killed 12 people in China on November 10, dissipating inland the following day.

Within the Philippines, Haiyan was the worst tropical cyclone to impact the island nation, as it became both the deadliest and most damaging typhoon since reliable records started in 1970. According to The Philippine National Disaster Risk Reduction and Management Council, a total of 6,300 people were reported to have died in Haiyan, with 5,902 or 93% of the deaths occurring in Eastern Visayas. The cause of most of these deaths was attributed to trauma and people drowning, however, other causes included being electrocuted and hit by uprooted trees. A total of 8000 deaths were associated with the storm and total damages were estimated at Php571 billion (US$13 billion).

In Vietnam, 14 people were killed indirectly by the storm. Haiyan also triggered floods in mainland China, leaving 30 people dead and damages of CN¥4.58 billion (US$750 million).

=== Tropical Storm Podul (Zoraida) ===
- Tropical storm (JMA)
- Tropical depression (SSHWS)
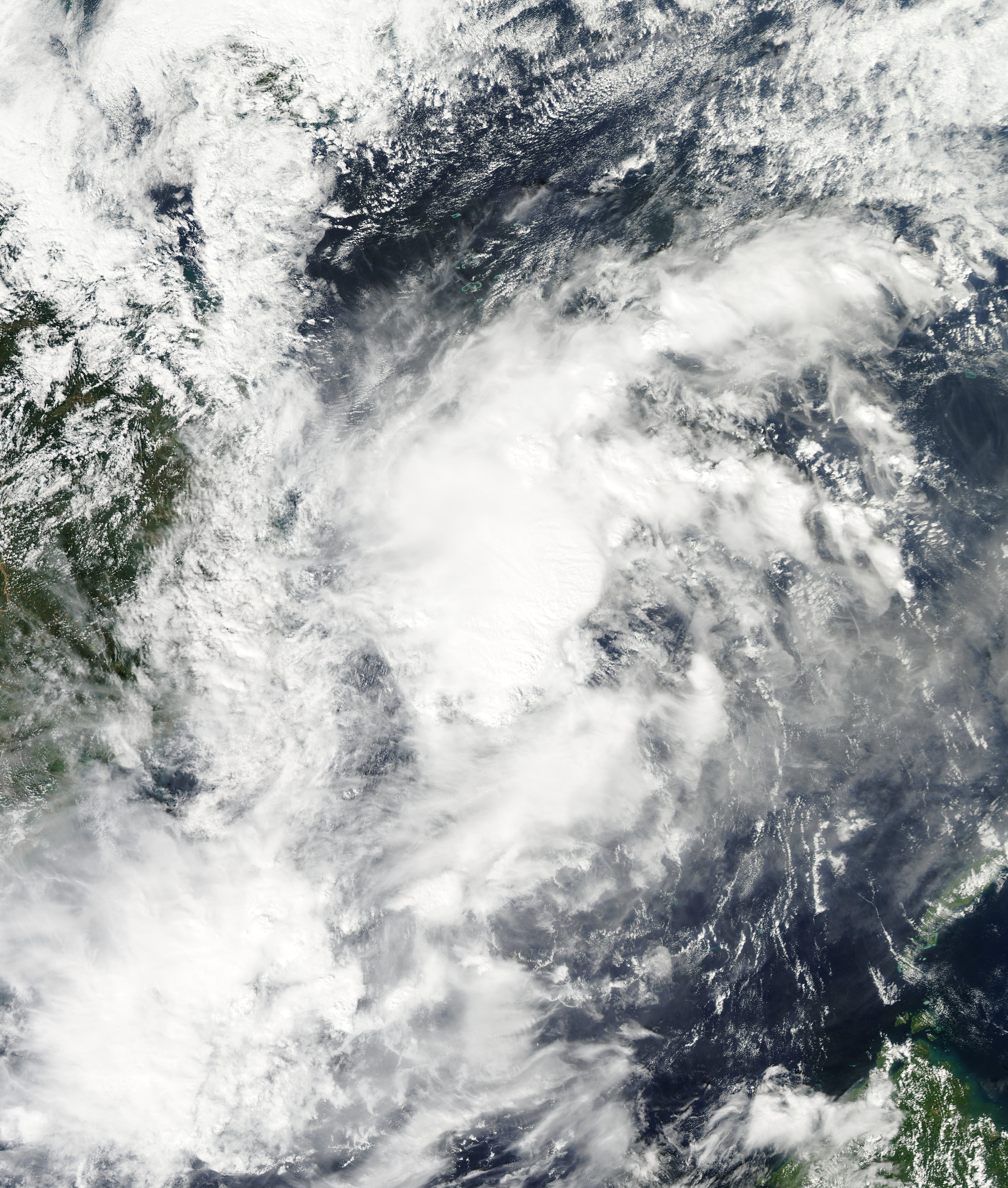
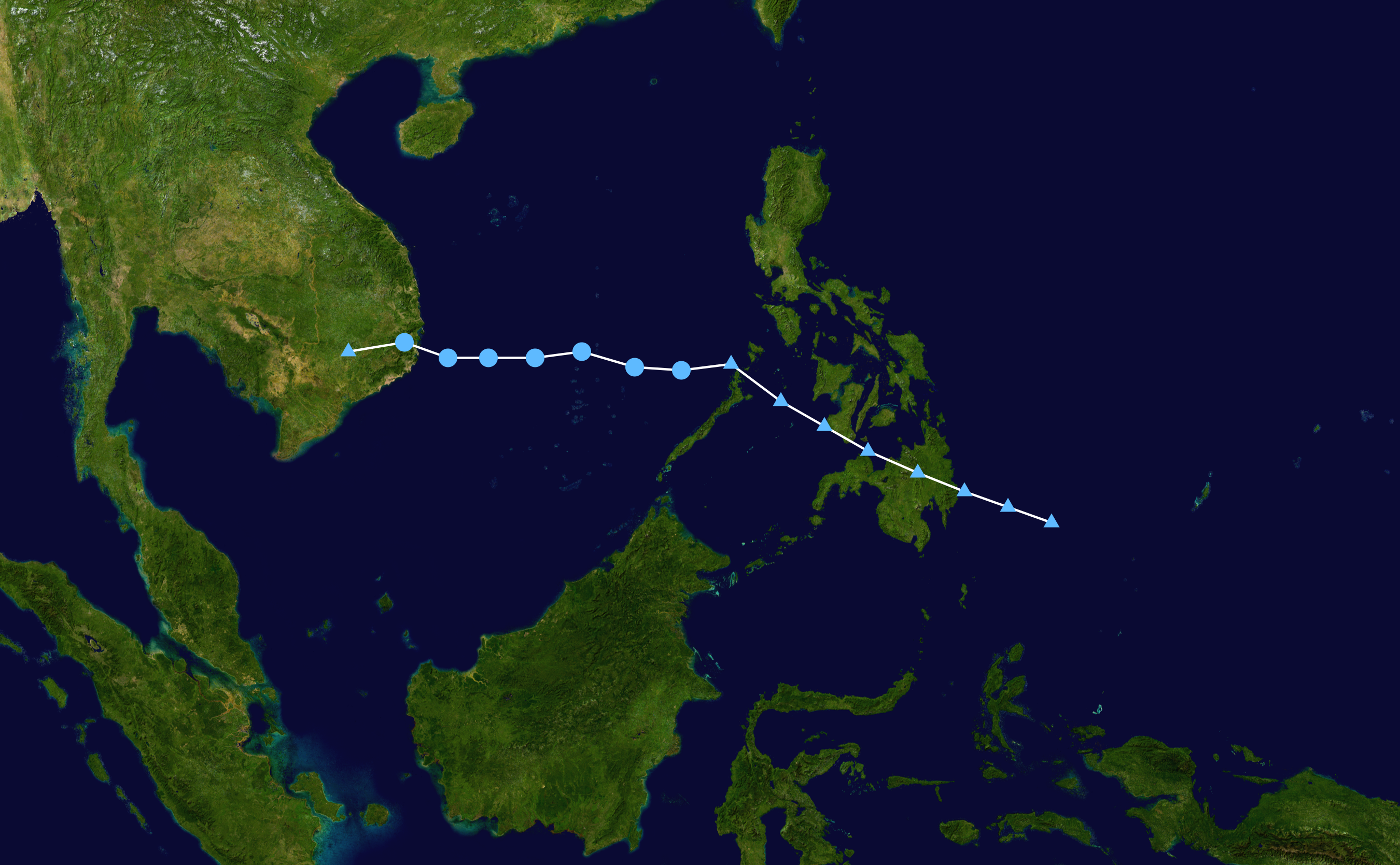
- Duration: November 11 – November 15
- Peak intensity: 65 km/h (40 mph) (10-min); 1000 hPa (mbar)

Early on November 9, the JMA reported that a disorganized tropical depression had developed to the southeast of Koror, Palau. Following an increase in organization, the JTWC issued a Tropical Cyclone Formation Alert for the system during November 10, as it was named Zoraida by PAGASA. Early on November 12, Tropical Depression Zoraida made landfall over Davao Oriental province in Eastern Mindando, before it moved into the Sulu Sea later that day.

On November 14, the system intensified to a tropical storm, and it was named Podul by the JMA. Early on November 15, the JTWC issued their final warning on Podul, as the remnants of the system's low level circulation center made landfall over Vietnam. After moving westwards through Vietnam and Cambodia and into the Gulf of Thailand, Podul was last noted by the JMA and the Thai Meteorological Department during the next day. The remnants of Podul later entered the Bay of Bengal and regenerated into Severe Cyclonic Storm Helen.

=== Tropical Depression 33W ===
- Tropical depression (JMA)
- Tropical depression (SSHWS)
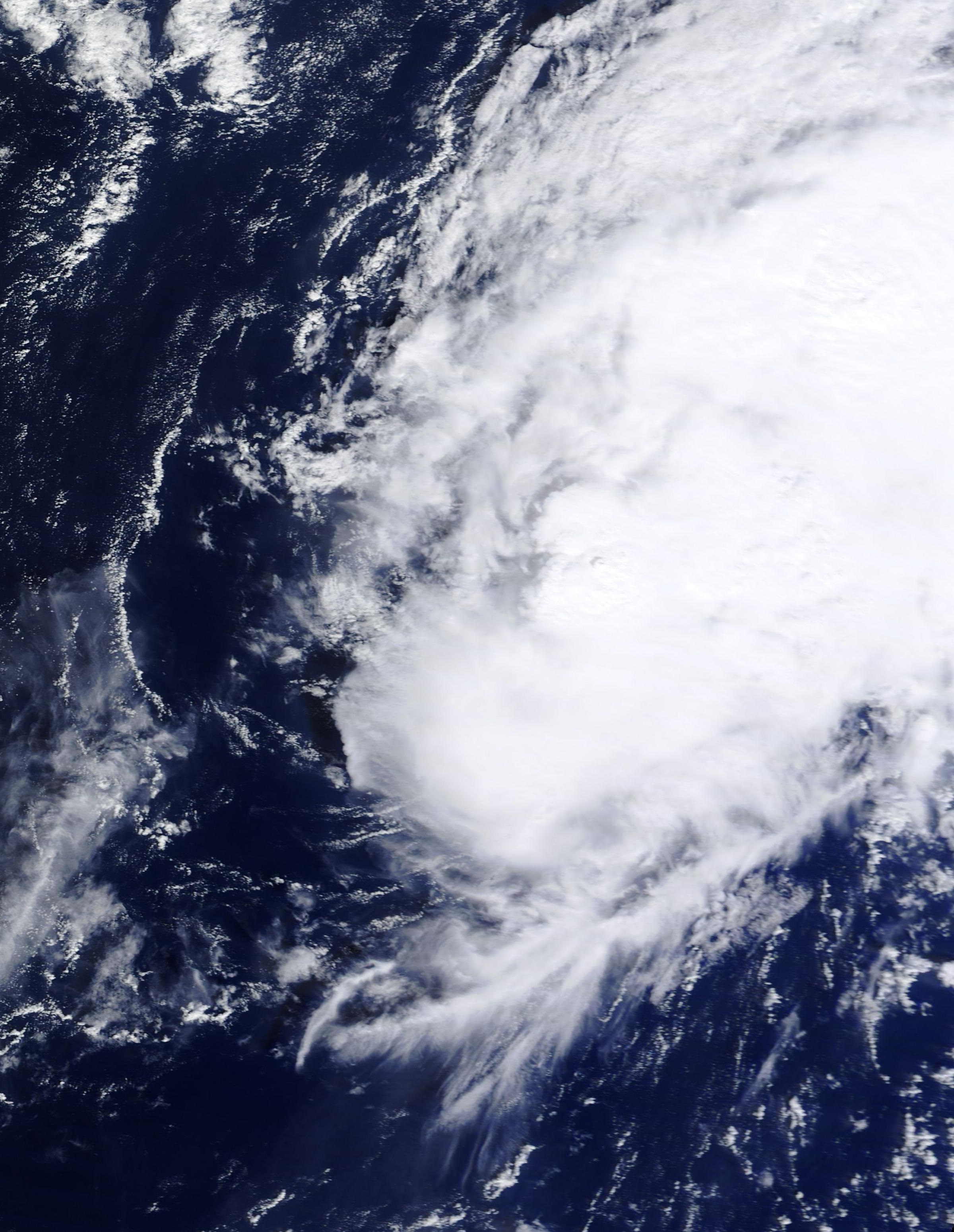
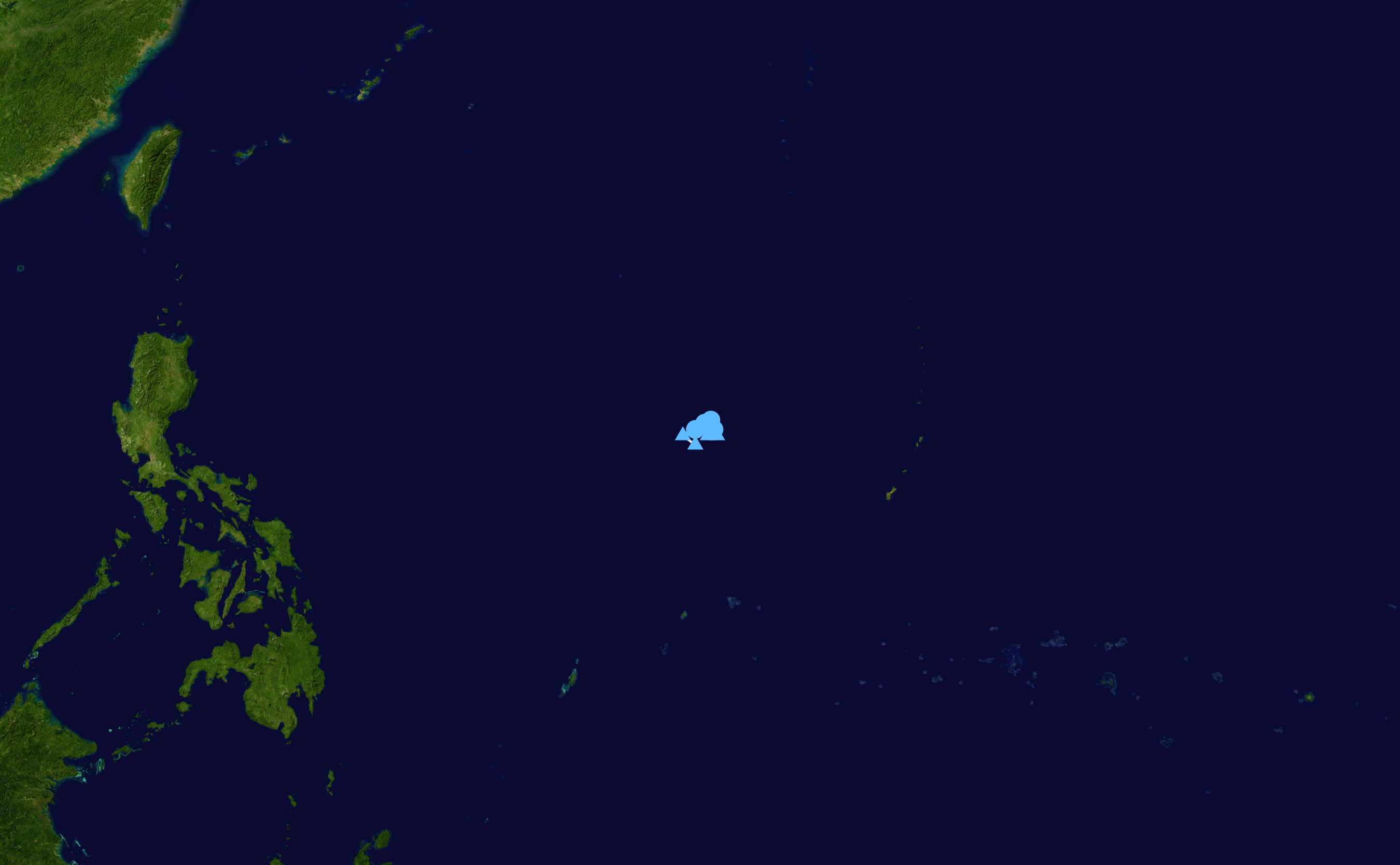
- Duration: December 2 – December 4
- Peak intensity: 55 km/h (35 mph) (1-min); 1006 hPa (mbar)

Tropical Depression 33W was a short lived tropical depression that was first noted as a tropical disturbance during December 2, while it was located about 685 km (425 mi) to the northeast of Hagåtña, Guam. Over the next day, the system quickly developed into a tropical depression, within marginal environment for further development, before it was declared to be a tropical depression during December 3. However, the system quickly weakened and was last noted as it dissipated over the Pacific Ocean to the northwest of Guam during the next day.

=== Other systems ===
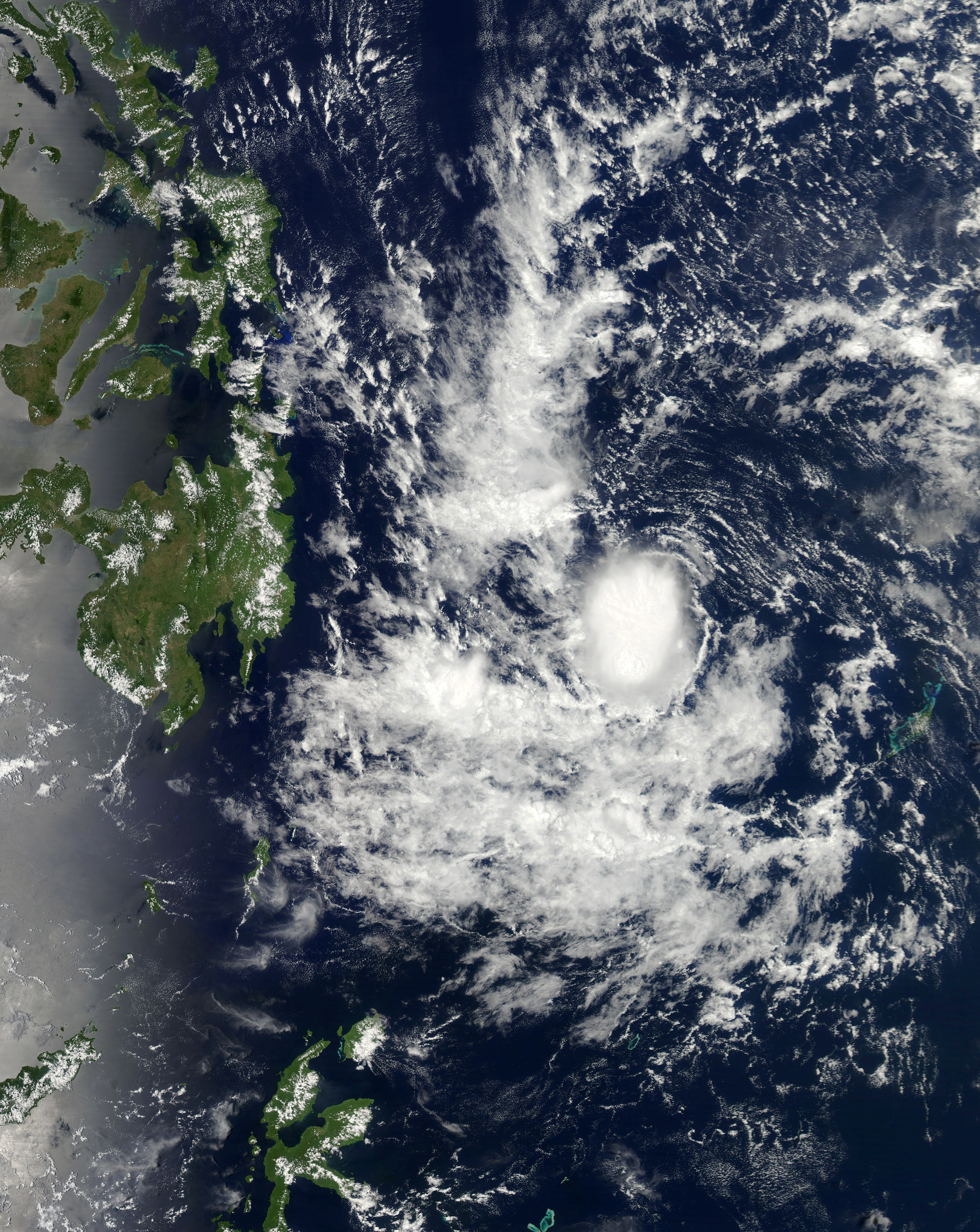
A tropical depression near the Philippines on March 20, 2013

Early on March 20, the JMA reported that a tropical depression had developed about 1,470 km (915 mi) to the southeast of Manila, in an area of moderate vertical wind shear. Over the next two days the system moved towards the west-northwest, before it was last noted by the JMA during March 22, as it dissipated over Southern Mindanao.

During April 11, the JMA reported that a tropical depression had briefly developed within the Gulf of Thailand, about 440 km (275 mi) to the southeast of Ho Chi Minh City.

On June 14, the CMA reported that a tropical depression had developed within a broad circulation that spanned most of the South China Sea, about 420 km (260 mi) to the southwest of Hong Kong. Over the next day the system moved towards the north-east and in conjunction with an area of high pressure located over south-eastern China, brought strong winds to south-eastern China and Hong Kong. The system was subsequently last noted by the CMA during the next day while it was located over Hainan Island.

Early on July 18, the JMA reported that a tropical depression had developed within the monsoon trough in an unfavorable environment for further development, about 710 km (440 mi) to the southwest of Manila. Over the next couple of days the system moved towards Hainan Island and Northern Vietnam, before it was last noted on July 20, as it dissipated about 250 km (155 mi) to the southeast of Hanoi, Vietnam.

On August 10, the JMA reported that a tropical depression had developed about 500 km (310 mi) to the southeast of Manila in the Philippines.

Tropical Depression Three-C moved into the Western Pacific basin, from the Central Pacific during August 20. However, the system quickly dissipated within the Western Pacific, as it suffered from increased vertical wind shear, which was caused by the outflow of Typhoon Pewa. Early on August 27, the JMA reported that a tropical depression had developed about 685 km (425 mi) to the south of Hong Kong. Early on August 28, the JMA started to monitor a tropical depression that had developed despite strong vertical wind shear about 925 km (575 mi) northwest of Anderson Air Force Base in Guam. Remaining nearly stationary, dry air started to wrap in to the system's fully exposed low level circulation center. The system dissipated two days later on August 30.

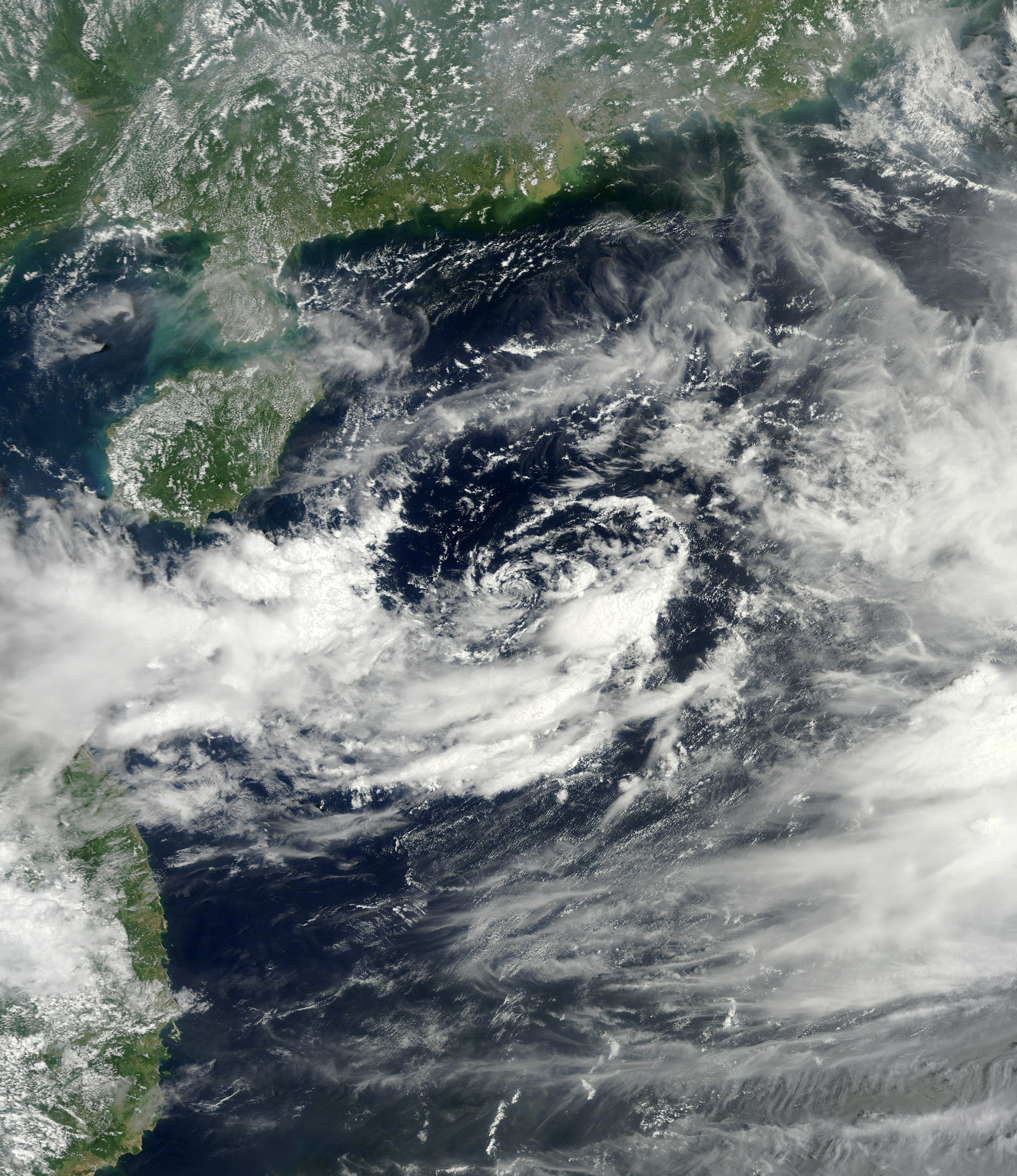
A tropical depression in the South China Sea on August 28, 2013

Early on September 6, the JMA reported that a tropical depression had developed about 420 km (260 mi) to the northeast of Manila. The system moved towards the west-northwest before it was last noted by the JMA later that day, as a new tropical depression developed about 1,400 km (870 mi) to the southeast of Wake Island. The next day, the depression moved towards the west-northwest before it was last noted by the JMA later that day. On September 23, the JMA noted that a tropical depression had briefly developed about 1,600 km (995 mi) the north of Wake Island. Late on October 2, the JMA started to monitor a tropical depression that had developed about 900 km (560 mi) to the northeast of Wake Island. Over the next day, the system remained nearly stationary before it was last noted on October 4. On October 4, the JMA started to monitor a tropical depression, that had developed within the Gulf of Thailand. Over the next couple of days, the system moved westward within an area of low to moderate vertical wind shear, before it passed over the Malay Peninsula and moved out of the Western Pacific Basin on October 6, and later developed into Cyclone Phailin.

On November 18, the JMA noted that a tropical depression had developed, about 215 km (135 mi) to the west of Bandar Seri Begawan. During that day it moved westwards, but was last noted by the JMA later that day. During the next day the JMA reported that a tropical depression had developed, about 365 km (225 mi) to the west of Kuala Lumpur. Over the next few days the system moved towards the west-northwest and moved into an extremely favorable environment, for further development while located over the Malay Peninsula during November 21. The next day, it crossed 100°E and moved into the North Indian Ocean, where it later developed into Cyclone Lehar.

== Storm names ==
Within the North-western Pacific Ocean, both the Japan Meteorological Agency (JMA) and the Philippine Atmospheric, Geophysical and Astronomical Services Administration assign names to tropical cyclones that develop in the Western Pacific, which can result in a tropical cyclone having two names. The Japan Meteorological Agency's RSMC Tokyo — Typhoon Center assigns international names to tropical cyclones on behalf of the World Meteorological Organization's Typhoon Committee, should they be judged to have 10-minute sustained windspeeds of 65 km/h (40 mph). While the Philippine Atmospheric, Geophysical and Astronomical Services Administration assigns names to tropical cyclones which move into or form as a tropical depression in their area of responsibility located between 135°E and 115°E and between 5°N-25°N even if the cyclone has had an international name assigned to it. The names of significant tropical cyclones are retired, by both PAGASA and the Typhoon Committee. Should the list of names for the Philippine region be exhausted then names will be taken from an auxiliary list of which the first ten are published each season. Unused names are marked in gray.

=== International names ===
During the season 31 tropical storms developed in the Western Pacific and 29 were named by the JMA, when the system was judged to have 10-minute sustained windspeeds of 65 km/h (40 mph). The JMA selected the names from a list of 140 names, that had been developed by the 14 members nations and territories of the ESCAP/WMO Typhoon Committee. During the season the names Leepi and Mangkhut were used for the first time, after they had replaced the names Xangsane and Durian, which were retired after the 2006 season.

Sonamu	Shanshan	Yagi	Leepi	Bebinca	Rumbia	Soulik	Cimaron	Jebi	Mangkhut	Utor	Trami	Kong-rey	Yutu	Toraji
Man-yi	Usagi	Pabuk	Wutip	Sepat	Fitow	Danas	Nari	Wipha	Francisco	Lekima	Krosa	Haiyan	Podul	

- Additionally, Pewa and Unala entered the Western Pacific basin from the Central Pacific basin after crossing the International Date Line (180°E) as a tropical cyclone. As the system crossed between basins intact, it retained the name assigned to it by the National Hurricane Center.

==== Retirement ====
After the season the Typhoon Committee retired the names Sonamu, Utor, Fitow and Haiyan from its naming lists, and in February 2015, the names were subsequently replaced with Jongdari, Barijat, Mun and Bailu for future seasons.

=== Philippines ===
Auring	Bising	Crising	Dante	Emong
Fabian	Gorio	Huaning	Isang	Jolina
Kiko	Labuyo	Maring	Nando	Odette
Paolo	Quedan	Ramil	Santi	Tino
Urduja	Vinta	Wilma	Yolanda	Zoraida
Auxiliary list
Alamid (unused)	Bruno (unused)	Conching (unused)	Dolor (unused)	Ernie (unused)
Florante (unused)	Gerardo (unused)	Hernan (unused)	Isko (unused)	Jerome (unused)

During the season PAGASA used its own naming scheme for the 25 tropical cyclones, which is the highest since 2004, that either developed within or moved into their self-defined area of responsibility. This is the same list used during the 2009 season, except for the names Fabian, Odette, and Paolo, which replaced Feria, Ondoy, and Pepeng, respectively. All three names were used for the first time, as well as the names Wilma, Yolanda, and Zoraida (and only, in the case of Yolanda).

==== Retirement ====
After the season the names Labuyo, Santi and Yolanda were retired by PAGASA, as they had caused over 300 deaths and over PhP1 billion in damages. They were subsequently replaced on the list with Lannie, Salome and Yasmin.

== Season effects ==
This table lists all the storms that developed in the northwestern Pacific Ocean west of the International Date Line and north of the equator during 2013. It includes their intensity, duration, name, areas affected, deaths, and damage totals. Classification and intensity values are based on estimations conducted by the JMA. All damage figures are in 2013 USD. Damages and deaths from a storm include when the storm was a precursor wave or an extratropical low.

Name	Dates	Peak intensity			Areas affected	Damage (USD)	Deaths	Ref(s).
Name	Dates	Category	Wind speed	Pressure	Areas affected	Damage (USD)	Deaths	Ref(s).
Sonamu (Auring)	January 1–10	Severe tropical storm	95 km/h (59 mph)	990 hPa (29.23 inHg)	Philippines, Vietnam, Borneo	Minimal	2	
Bising	January 6–13	Tropical depression	55 km/h (34 mph)	1,002 hPa (29.59 inHg)	Philippines	$37,000	None	
Shanshan (Crising)	February 18–23	Tropical storm	65 km/h (40 mph)	1,002 hPa (29.59 inHg)	Philippines, Borneo	$275,000	11	
TD	March 20–21	Tropical depression	Not specified	1,006 hPa (29.71 inHg)	Philippines	None	None	
Yagi (Dante)	June 6–12	Tropical storm	85 km/h (53 mph)	990 hPa (29.23 inHg)	Philippines, Japan	None	None	
TD	June 14–15	Tropical depression	55 km/h (34 mph)	994 hPa (29.35 inHg)	China, Hong Kong	None	None	
Leepi (Emong)	June 16–21	Tropical storm	75 km/h (47 mph)	994 hPa (29.35 inHg)	Philippines, Taiwan, Ryukyu Islands, South Korea, Japan	None	None	
Bebinca (Fabian)	June 19–24	Tropical storm	75 km/h (47 mph)	990 hPa (29.23 inHg)	Philippines, China, Vietnam	$53 million	1	
Rumbia (Gorio)	June 27 – July 2	Severe tropical storm	95 km/h (59 mph)	985 hPa (29.09 inHg)	Philippines, China	$191 million	7	
Soulik (Huaning)	July 7–14	Very strong typhoon	185 km/h (115 mph)	925 hPa (27.32 inHg)	Philippines, Japan, Taiwan, China	$600 million	15	
Cimaron (Isang)	July 15–18	Tropical storm	75 km/h (47 mph)	1,000 hPa (29.53 inHg)	Philippines, Taiwan, China	$322 million	6	
TD	July 18–20	Tropical depression	55 km/h (34 mph)	1,000 hPa (29.53 inHg)	None	None	None	
Jebi (Jolina)	July 28 – August 3	Severe tropical storm	95 km/h (59 mph)	985 hPa (29.09 inHg)	Philippines, China, Vietnam, Laos, Thailand	$83.2 million	7	
Mangkhut (Kiko)	August 5–8	Tropical storm	75 km/h (47 mph)	992 hPa (29.29 inHg)	Philippines, Vietnam, China, Laos, Thailand	$56.1 million	4	
Utor (Labuyo)	August 8–18	Violent typhoon	195 km/h (121 mph)	925 hPa (27.32 inHg)	Philippines, China	$3.55 billion	97	
TD	August 10–12	Tropical depression	Not specified	1,002 hPa (29.59 inHg)	None	None	None	
13W	August 15–19	Tropical depression	55 km/h (34 mph)	996 hPa (29.41 inHg)	Okinawa, China	None	None	
Trami (Maring)	August 16–24	Severe tropical storm	110 km/h (68 mph)	965 hPa (28.50 inHg)	Philippines, Taiwan, Okinawa, China	$598 million	34	
Pewa	August 18–26	Severe tropical storm	100 km/h (62 mph)	990 hPa (29.23 inHg)	None	None	None	
Unala	August 19	Tropical storm	65 km/h (40 mph)	1,000 hPa (29.53 inHg)	None	None	None	
03C	August 20	Tropical depression	50 km/h (30 mph)	1,008 hPa (29.77 inHg)	None	None	None	
Kong-rey (Nando)	August 25–30	Severe tropical storm	100 km/h (62 mph)	980 hPa (28.94 inHg)	Philippines, Taiwan, China, Japan, South Korea	$21.2 million	9	
TD	August 27–29	Tropical depression	Not specified	1,002 hPa (29.59 inHg)	None	None	None	
TD	August 27–30	Tropical depression	Not specified	1,008 hPa (29.77 inHg)	None	None	None	
Yutu	August 29 – September 5	Tropical storm	65 km/h (40 mph)	1,002 hPa (29.59 inHg)	None	None	None	
Toraji	August 31 – September 4	Severe tropical storm	95 km/h (59 mph)	985 hPa (29.09 inHg)	Taiwan, Japan	Minimal	3	
Man-yi	September 11–16	Strong typhoon	120 km/h (75 mph)	960 hPa (28.35 inHg)	Japan, Kamchatka Peninsula	$1.62 billion	6	
18W	September 15–21	Tropical depression	55 km/h (34 mph)	996 hPa (29.41 inHg)	Vietnam, Laos, Thailand	$96.6 million	27	
Usagi (Odette)	September 16–24	Violent typhoon	205 km/h (125 mph)	910 hPa (26.87 inHg)	Philippines, Taiwan, China	$4.32 billion	39	
Pabuk	September 19–27	Severe tropical storm	110 km/h (68 mph)	965 hPa (28.50 inHg)	Northern Mariana Islands	None	None	
TD	September 22–23	Tropical depression	Not specified	1,010 hPa (29.83 inHg)	None	None	None	
Wutip (Paolo)	September 25 – October 1	Strong typhoon	120 km/h (75 mph)	965 hPa (28.50 inHg)	Philippines, Vietnam, Thailand, Laos, China	$648 million	27	
Sepat	September 29 – October 2	Tropical storm	75 km/h (47 mph)	992 hPa (29.29 inHg)	Japan, Kamchatka Peninsula	None	None	
Fitow (Quedan)	September 29 – October 7	Strong typhoon	140 km/h (87 mph)	960 hPa (28.35 inHg)	Philippines, Palau, Ryukyu Islands, Taiwan, China	$10.4 billion	12	
Danas (Ramil)	October 1–9	Very strong typhoon	165 km/h (103 mph)	935 hPa (27.61 inHg)	Northern Mariana Islands, Guam, Ryukyu Islands, Japan, South Korea	$228,000	None	
TD	October 2–4	Tropical depression	Not specified	1,006 hPa (29.71 inHg)	None	None	None	
Phailin	October 5–6	Tropical depression	Not specified	1,004 hPa (29.65 inHg)	Malay Peninsula	None	None	
Nari (Santi)	October 8–16	Strong typhoon	140 km/h (87 mph)	965 hPa (28.50 inHg)	Philippines, China, Indochina	$289 million	94	
Wipha (Tino)	October 9–16	Very strong typhoon	165 km/h (103 mph)	930 hPa (27.46 inHg)	Northern Mariana Islands, Guam, Japan, Kamchatka Peninsula, Alaska	$405 million	41	
Francisco (Urduja)	October 15–26	Violent typhoon	195 km/h (121 mph)	920 hPa (27.17 inHg)	Guam, Japan	$150,000	None	
27W	October 17–22	Tropical depression	55 km/h (34 mph)	1,002 hPa (29.59 inHg)	None	None	None	
Lekima	October 19–26	Violent typhoon	215 km/h (134 mph)	905 hPa (26.72 inHg)	Northern Mariana Islands, Iwo Jima, Japan	None	None	
Krosa (Vinta)	October 27 – November 5	Strong typhoon	140 km/h (87 mph)	970 hPa (28.64 inHg)	Philippines, Taiwan, China, Vietnam	$6.4 million	4	
30W (Wilma)	November 2–7	Tropical depression	55 km/h (34 mph)	1,004 hPa (29.65 inHg)	Palau, Philippines, Vietnam, Cambodia, Thailand, Myanmar	$1.5 million	None	
Haiyan (Yolanda)	November 3–11	Violent typhoon	230 km/h (140 mph)	895 hPa (26.43 inHg)	Chuuk, Yap, Palau, Philippines, Vietnam, Laos, China	$2.98 billion	6,352	
Podul (Zoraida)	November 11–15	Tropical storm	65 km/h (40 mph)	1,000 hPa (29.53 inHg)	Palau, Philippines, Vietnam, Cambodia, Thailand	$194 million	46	
TD	November 17–18	Tropical depression	Not specified	1,006 hPa (29.71 inHg)	Vietnam	None	None	
Lehar	November 19–22	Tropical depression	Not specified	1,004 hPa (29.65 inHg)	Indonesia, Malaysia, Thailand	None	None	
33W	December 3	Tropical depression	Not specified	1,006 hPa (29.71 inHg)	None	None	None	
Season aggregates
49 systems	January 1 – December 4, 2013		230 km/h (145 mph)	895 hPa (26.43 inHg)		$26.4 billion	6,834	

== See also ==
- Tropical cyclones in 2013
- Pacific typhoon season
- 2013 Pacific hurricane season
- 2013 Atlantic hurricane season
- 2013 North Indian Ocean cyclone season
- South-West Indian Ocean cyclone seasons: 2012–13, 2013–14
- Australian region cyclone seasons: 2012–13, 2013–14
- South Pacific cyclone seasons: 2012–13, 2013–14
