= List of storms named Sonamu =

The name Sonamu (Korean: 소나무, [sʰo̞na̠mu]) has been used for three tropical cyclones in the western North Pacific Ocean. The name was contributed by North Korea and refers to the red pine (Pinus densiflora) in Korean.

- Severe Tropical Storm Sonamu (2000) (T0017, 25W) – approached Japan.
- Tropical Storm Sonamu (2006) (T0611, 12W, Katring) – no threat to land; absorbed by Tropical Storm Wukong.
- Severe Tropical Storm Sonamu (2013) (T1301, 01W, Auring) – hit the Philippines.

The name Sonamu was retired after the 2013 Pacific typhoon season due to its similar pronunciation with "tsunami" and reportedly causing panic among Malay citizens. It was replaced with Jongdari, which means Eurasian skylark in Korean.

== See also ==
- Cyclone Namu (1986) – a South Pacific tropical cyclone with a similar name.
