= List of storms named Crising =

The name Crising has been used for seven tropical cyclones by PAGASA in the Western Pacific Ocean.

- Severe Tropical Storm Cimaron (2001) (T0101, 03W, Crising) – struck the Philippines
- Tropical Depression Crising (2005) – only recognized by PAGASA
- Tropical Depression Crising (2009) – only recognized by PAGASA
- Tropical Storm Shanshan (2013) (T1302, 02W, Crising) – an early-season tropical storm which affected the Philippines and Malaysia
- Tropical Depression 02W (2017) (02W, Crising) – another early-season system which directly affected Visayas as a precursor low pressure system
- Tropical Depression 03W (2021) (03W, Crising) – a very small storm that struck Mindanao in early May
- Severe Tropical Storm Wipha (2025) (T2506, 09W, Crising) – a Category 1-equivalent typhoon that impacted the Philippines, China, Vietnam and Thailand.

The name Crising was retired following the 2025 season and was replaced with Chico for the 2029 season, which means sapodilla.
