= List of tropical cyclones near the Equator =

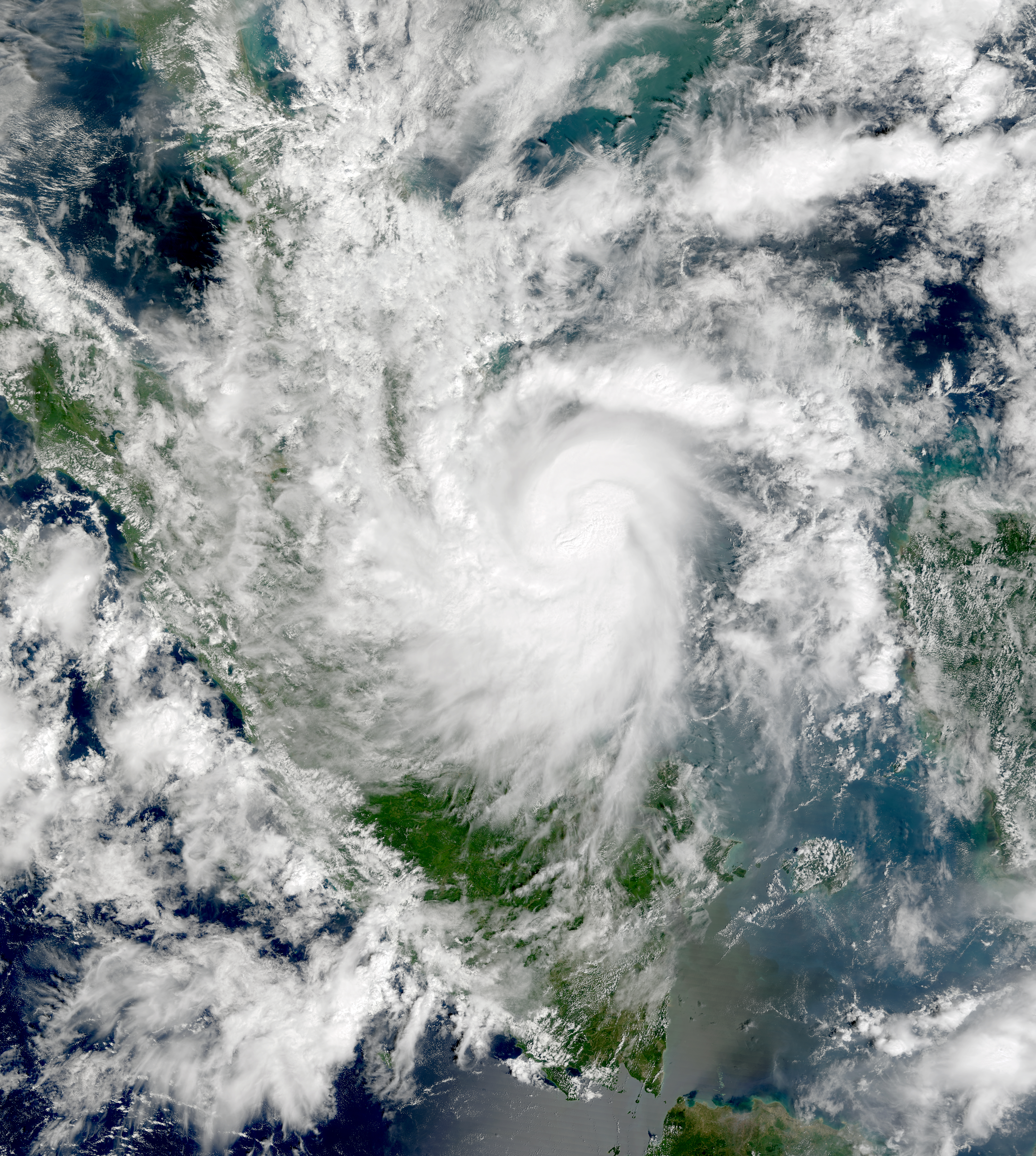
Tropical Storm Vamei near the equator in December 2001

Typically, tropical cyclones form at least 5.0 degrees of latitude north and south of the equator, or at least 300 nautical miles (556 km, 345 mi) from the equator. Within 5 degrees of the equator, tropical cyclogenesis is uncommon despite the presence of sufficiently warm sea surface temperatures and generally low wind shear, as a result of the lack of a strong Coriolis force, which causes cyclones to spin. On rare occasions, tropical cyclones can develop within 5° of the equator, most commonly in the northwestern Pacific Ocean.

== Background ==
For centuries, sailors haven't worried about tropical storms near the equator. It's a rule that cyclones are not supposed to develop there.

— Dr. Chih-Pei Chang, professor at the United States Naval Research Laboratory

Various factors converge to produce a tropical cyclone, including sufficiently warm sea surface temperatures, low wind shear, ample moisture, and enough atmospheric instability to produce thunderstorms. In addition, for a tropical disturbance to develop into a tropical cyclone, it typically needs to be far enough away from the equator, where there is sufficient vorticity for the weather system to spin. This is because the vorticity generated by the Earth's rotation through the Coriolis force (called planetary vorticity) is zero at the equator and increases toward the poles. This lack of planetary vorticity can be overcome if there is sufficient relative vorticity produced via other means. One such phenomenon that can contribute to the development of low-latitude tropical cyclones is the equatorial westerly wind burst, which generates sufficient shear vorticity on both sides of the equator to support tropical cyclogenesis. Westerly wind bursts are most common in the equatorial Western Pacific Ocean.

== List ==
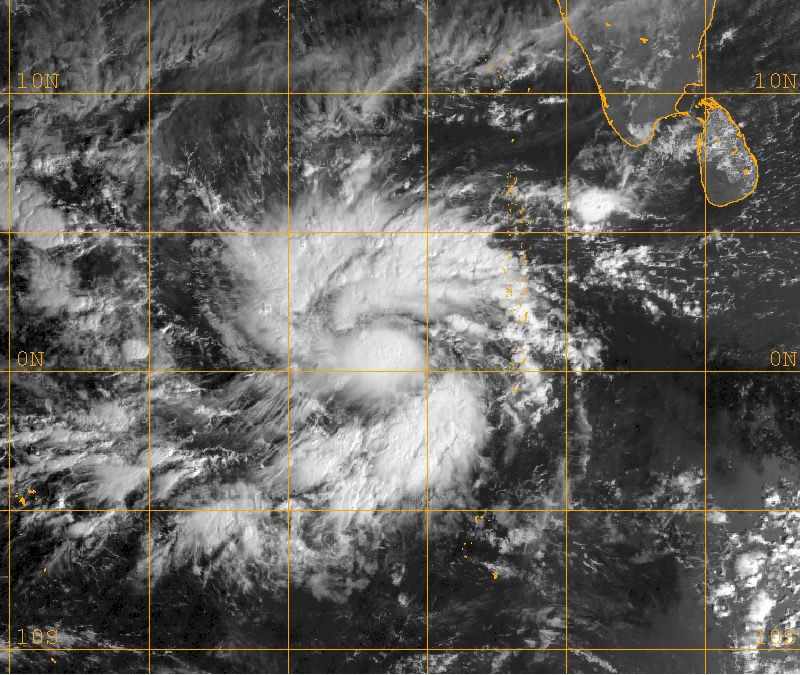
Satellite image of Cyclone Agni in October 2004 in its formative stage near the equator

Storm	Year	Peak classification	Basin	Minimum Latitude	Ref(s)
Tropical Storm Vamei	2001	Tropical storm	Northwestern Pacific	1.4°N	
Cyclone Agni	2004	Severe cyclonic storm	North Indian	1.5°N	
Typhoon Sarah	1956	Typhoon	Northwestern Pacific	1.7°N	
Typhoon Alice	1979	Very strong typhoon	Northwestern Pacific	2.0°N	
Tropical Storm Peipah	2014	Tropical storm	Northwestern Pacific	2.0°N	
Tropical Depression	2023	Tropical depression	Northwestern Pacific	2.0°N	
Tropical Depression Nine-C	2015	Tropical depression	Northeastern Pacific	2.2°N	
Tropical Storm Patsy	1977	Severe tropical storm	Northwestern Pacific	2.5°N	
Tropical Storm Abaimba	2003	Moderate tropical storm	South-West Indian Ocean	2.5°S	
Hurricane Pali	2016	Category 2 hurricane	Northeastern Pacific	2.6°N	
Tropical Storm Kai-tak	2017	Tropical storm	Northwestern Pacific	2.6°N	
Cyclone Fani	2019	Extremely severe cyclonic storm	North Indian	2.7°N	
Cyclone Fabien	2023	Intense tropical cyclone	South-West Indian Ocean	2.7°S	
Typhoon Harriet	1959	Typhoon	Northwestern Pacific	2.9°N	
Cyclone Ialy	2024	Tropical cyclone	South-West Indian Ocean	3.0°S	
Cyclone Senyar	2025	Cyclonic storm	North Indian and Northwestern Pacific	3.0°N	
Tropical Storm Sonamu	2013	Severe tropical storm	Northwestern Pacific	3.2°N	
Typhoon Bopha	2012	Very strong typhoon	Northwestern Pacific	3.4°N	
Unnamed Cyclonic Storm	2002	Severe cyclonic storm	North Indian	4.0°N	
Tropical Storm Shanshan	2013	Tropical storm	Northwestern Pacific	4.2°N	
Typhoon Kate	1970	Typhoon	Northwestern Pacific	4.3°N	
Severe Tropical Storm Axel	1992	Severe tropical storm	Northwestern Pacific	4.4°N	
Hurricane Ekeka	1992	Category 3 hurricane	Northeastern and Northwestern Pacific	4.5°N	
Severe Tropical Storm Agueda	2026	Severe tropical storm	South–West Indian Ocean	4.5°S	
Cyclone Bernie	1982	Category 4 severe tropical cyclone	Australian region	4.8°S	
Deep Depression BOB 01	2026	Deep Depression	North Indian	4.8°N	
Flores cyclone	1973	Category 3 severe tropical cyclone	Australian region	5.0°S	
Cyclonic Storm Hibaru	2005	Cyclonic storm	North Indian	5.0°N	
Deep Depression ARB 01	2006	Deep Depression	North Indian	5.0°N	

== See also ==
- List of tropical cyclone records
- Outline of tropical cyclones
