= List of storms named Shanshan =

The name Shanshan (Cantonese: 珊珊, [saːn˥ saːn˥]) has been used for five tropical cyclones in the western North Pacific Ocean. The name was contributed by Hong Kong and is a feminine given nickname meaning "sparkling" in Cantonese. In particular, this name is commemorative to the first athlete, Lee Lai-shan, to win an Olympic medal representing Hong Kong.

- Typhoon Shanshan (2000) (T0018, 26W) – a Category 4 Super Typhoon that did not threaten land.
- Typhoon Shanshan (2006) (T0613, 14W, Luis) – a costly Category 4 typhoon which impacted Japan.
- Tropical Storm Shanshan (2013) (T1302, 02W, Crising) – early season tropical storm that affected the Philippines and Malaysia.
- Typhoon Shanshan (2018) (T1813, 17W) – a slow-moving typhoon that passed closely to Japan.
- Typhoon Shanshan (2024) (T2410, 11W) – a costly Category 4 typhoon that brushed Japan as a weakening typhoon.

Preceded by Jongdari	Pacific typhoon season names Shanshan	Succeeded by Tomo
