= List of storms named Alice =

The name Alice has been used for 18 tropical cyclones worldwide. Four occurred in the Atlantic Ocean, ten in the West Pacific Ocean, one in the South-West Indian Ocean, and three in the Australian region. Alice has also been used for one European windstorm.

In the Atlantic:

- Tropical Storm Alice (1953) – made landfall in Honduras, Cuba, and Florida
- Hurricane Alice (June 1954) – formed in the Bay of Campeche and made landfall in northeastern Mexico, just south of the Mexico–United States border
- Hurricane Alice (December 1954) – produced heavy rainfall and moderately strong winds across the northern Leeward Islands; is one of only two known Atlantic tropical cyclones to span two calendar years
- Hurricane Alice (1973) – a Category 1 hurricane which affected Bermuda and Atlantic Canada

In the West Pacific:

- Typhoon Alice (1947) (T4716) – a Category 4 typhoon that did not approach land
- Typhoon Alice (1953) (T5318) – a long-lived Category 3 typhoon which did not affect land; crossed the International Date Line before dissipating
- Super Typhoon Alice (1958) (T5811) – a Category 4 typhoon that affected Japan; responsible for over 40 deaths on Hokkaido
- Typhoon Alice (1961) (T6103, 10W) – a Category 1 typhoon that formed in the South China Sea before making landfall near Hong Kong, killing four people there
- Typhoon Alice (1964) (T6404, 05W) – a short-lived Category 1 typhoon to the east of the Philippines
- Super Typhoon Alice (1966) (T6616, 16W) – a Category 4 typhoon that made landfall in eastern China
- Tropical Storm Alice (1969) (T6907, 07W) – a tropical storm that affected southern Japan
- Typhoon Alice (1972) (T7213, 13W) – a Category 2 typhoon that passed close to Japan's Boso Peninsula
- Typhoon Alice (1975) (T7511, 13W) – a Category 1 typhoon that passed over Luzon in the Philippines and the Chinese island of Hainan
- Typhoon Alice (1979) (T7901, 01W) – a Category 3 typhoon that caused severe damage in the Marshall Islands

In the South-West Indian:

- Tropical Storm Alice (1973) – a long-lived cyclone that passed through the southern Seychelles

In the Australian region:

- Cyclone Alice (1974) – stayed well to the east of the coast of New South Wales and Queensland
- Cyclone Alice (1976) – formed in the Timor Sea and moved west, stayed over the open ocean
- Cyclone Alice–Adelaide (1980) – a Category 3 tropical cyclone that formed near Sumatra and later crossed into the South-West Indian Ocean

In Europe:

- Storm Alice (2025) – affected the Iberian Peninsula
