= Typhoon Shanshan (2006) =

Pacific typhoon in 2006

Typhoon Shanshan (Luis)
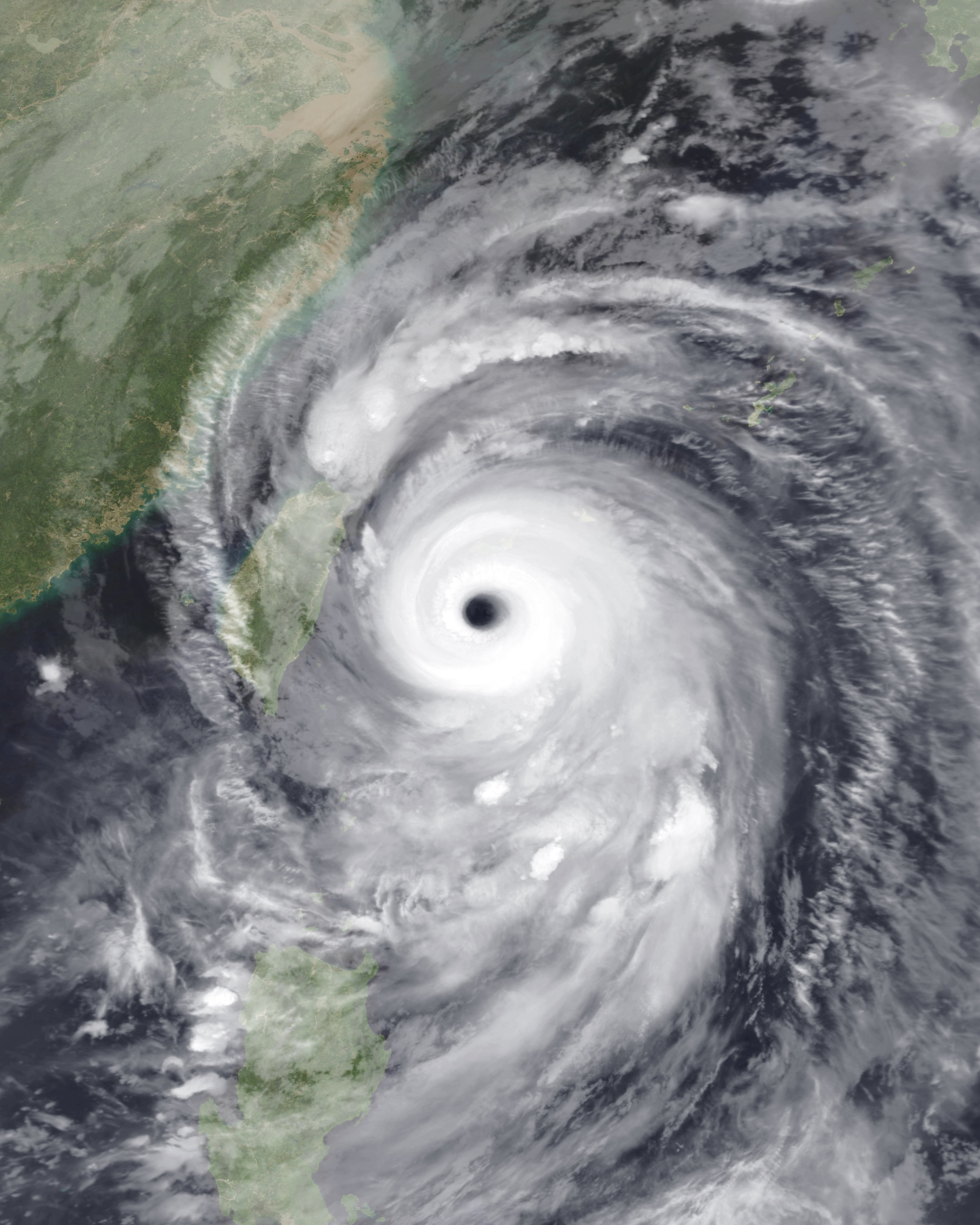
- Typhoon Shanshan prior to peak intensity on September 15

Meteorological history
- Formed: September 9, 2006
- Extratropical: September 18, 2006
- Dissipated: September 20, 2006

Violent typhoon
- 10-minute sustained (JMA)
- Highest winds: 205 km/h (125 mph)
- Lowest pressure: 919 hPa (mbar); 27.14 inHg

Category 4-equivalent typhoon
- 1-minute sustained (SSHWS/JTWC)
- Highest winds: 220 km/h (140 mph)
- Lowest pressure: 922 hPa (mbar); 27.23 inHg

Overall effects
- Fatalities: 11+
- Damage: $2.5 billion (2006 USD)
- Areas affected: South Korea, Japan, Taiwan
- IBTrACS
- Part of the 2006 Pacific typhoon season

Typhoon Shanshan, (Note: The name Shanshan (Cantonese: 珊珊, [saːn˥ saːn˥]) was contributed by Hong Kong and is a feminine given nickname meaning "sparkling" in Cantonese and was also named after Lee Lai-shan, commemorating the first athlete to win an Olympic medal representing Hong Kong.) known in the Philippines as Typhoon Luis, was a strong typhoon that affected parts of East Asia in mid-September 2006. The 13th named storm of the 2006 Pacific typhoon season, Typhoon Shanshan was also the seventh typhoon of the year operationally recognised by the Japan Meteorological Agency. In post-operational analysis Shanshan became the eighth typhoon of the year when Typhoon Maria was added to the list. The Joint Typhoon Warning Center considered Shanshan the 13th tropical storm and eighth typhoon of the season, a Category 4-equivalent typhoon in terms of 1-minute average wind speed.

Shanshan wreaked havoc in Japan, with reports that it caused a tornado which derailed a train. It made landfall first in the Yaeyama Islands, where it caused heavy rains, and later in Kyūshū. The outer bands of Shanshan also affected South Korea. Shanshan also knocked power out to thousands of homes in the two countries, and killed at least eleven people. Damage amounted to $2.5 billion (2006 USD), making Shanshan the sixth costliest disaster worldwide in 2006.

== Meteorological history ==
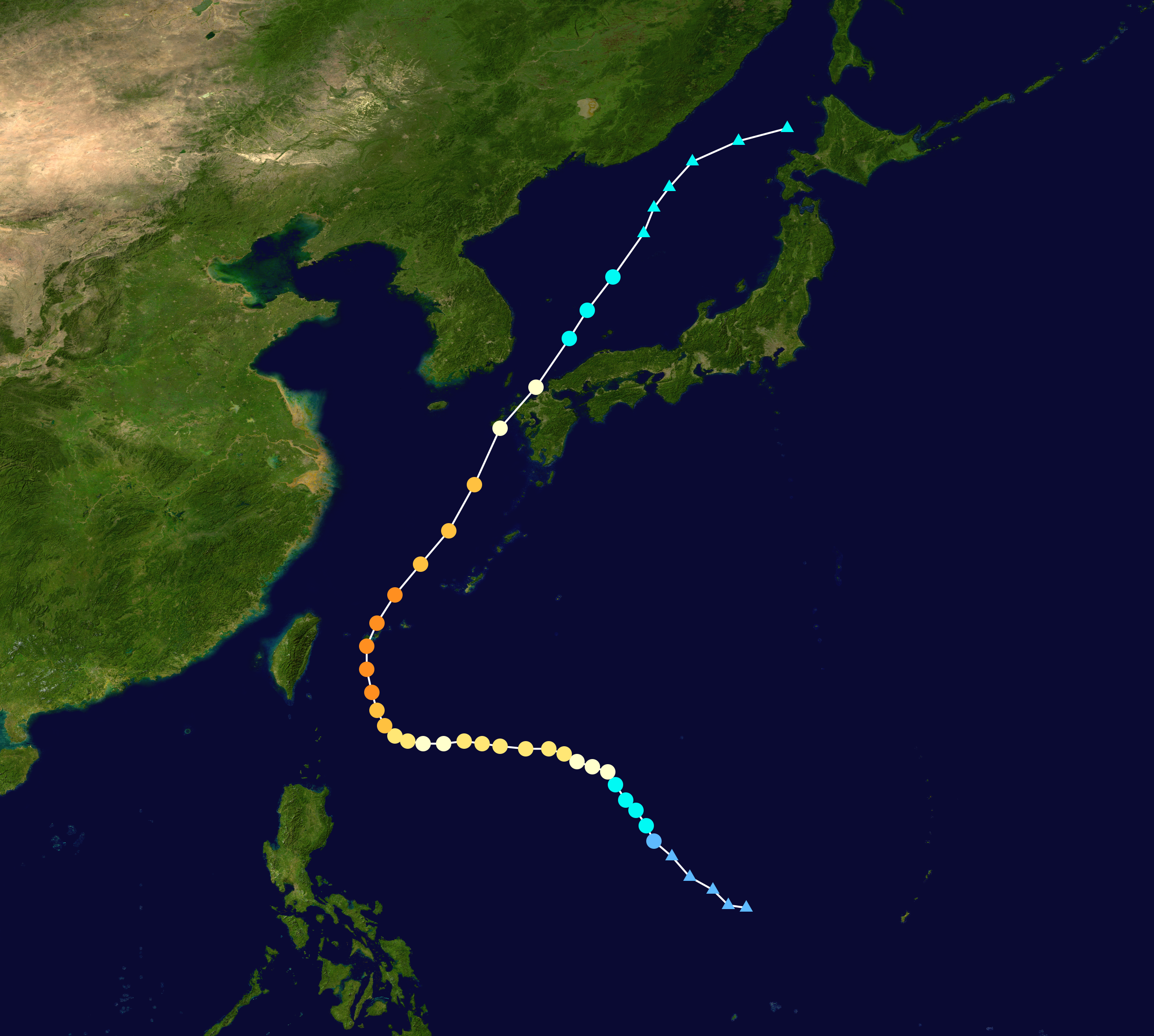
Map plotting the storm's track and intensity, according to the Saffir–Simpson scale Map key Saffir–Simpson scale Tropical depression (≤38 mph, ≤62 km/h) Tropical storm (39–73 mph, 63–118 km/h) Category 1 (74–95 mph, 119–153 km/h) Category 2 (96–110 mph, 154–177 km/h) Category 3 (111–129 mph, 178–208 km/h) Category 4 (130–156 mph, 209–251 km/h) Category 5 (≥157 mph, ≥252 km/h) Unknown Storm type Tropical cyclone Subtropical cyclone Extratropical cyclone, remnant low, tropical disturbance, or monsoon depression

On September 9, 2006, the Japan Meteorological Agency identified a tropical depression with 25-knot 10-minute average sustained winds about 500 kilometres (300 mi) north-northeast of Yap, near latitude 14.0°N longitude 139.0°E. Later that day, the Hong Kong Observatory (HKO) picked up on the tropical depression and started issuing track forecasts for the system.

As the system continued to move northwestward, the Joint Typhoon Warning Center initiated advisories on Tropical Depression 14W on the morning of September 10. Later that day, the tropical depression moved into the PAGASA Area of Responsibility, and was named Luis. As the system continued to strengthen, the JMA upgraded the depression to a storm at 1200 UTC and named it Shanshan. (Note: The name Shanshan (Cantonese: 珊珊, [saːn˥ saːn˥]) was contributed by Hong Kong and is a feminine given nickname meaning "sparkling" in Cantonese.) The HKO did the same at the same time, upgrading the depression to a storm.

The storm quickly strengthened, being upgraded twice by the JMA on September 11, at 0600 UTC to a severe tropical storm and at 1800 UTC to a typhoon, becoming the seventh official typhoon of the season. It then took on a more west-northwesterly track, weakening while undergoing an eyewall replacement cycle on September 14. However, it restrengthened, reaching its maximum intensity of 110 knots (200 km/h; 130 mph) from the JMA and 120 knots (220 km/h; 140 mph) from the JTWC before passing Iriomote on September 15. Originally expected by the JTWC to pass to the east of Okinawa Island, a subtropical high-pressure ridge south of the main Japanese islands forced the storm to take a more westward track, pushing it towards Taiwan. Shortly later, Shanshan passed directly over Iriomote.

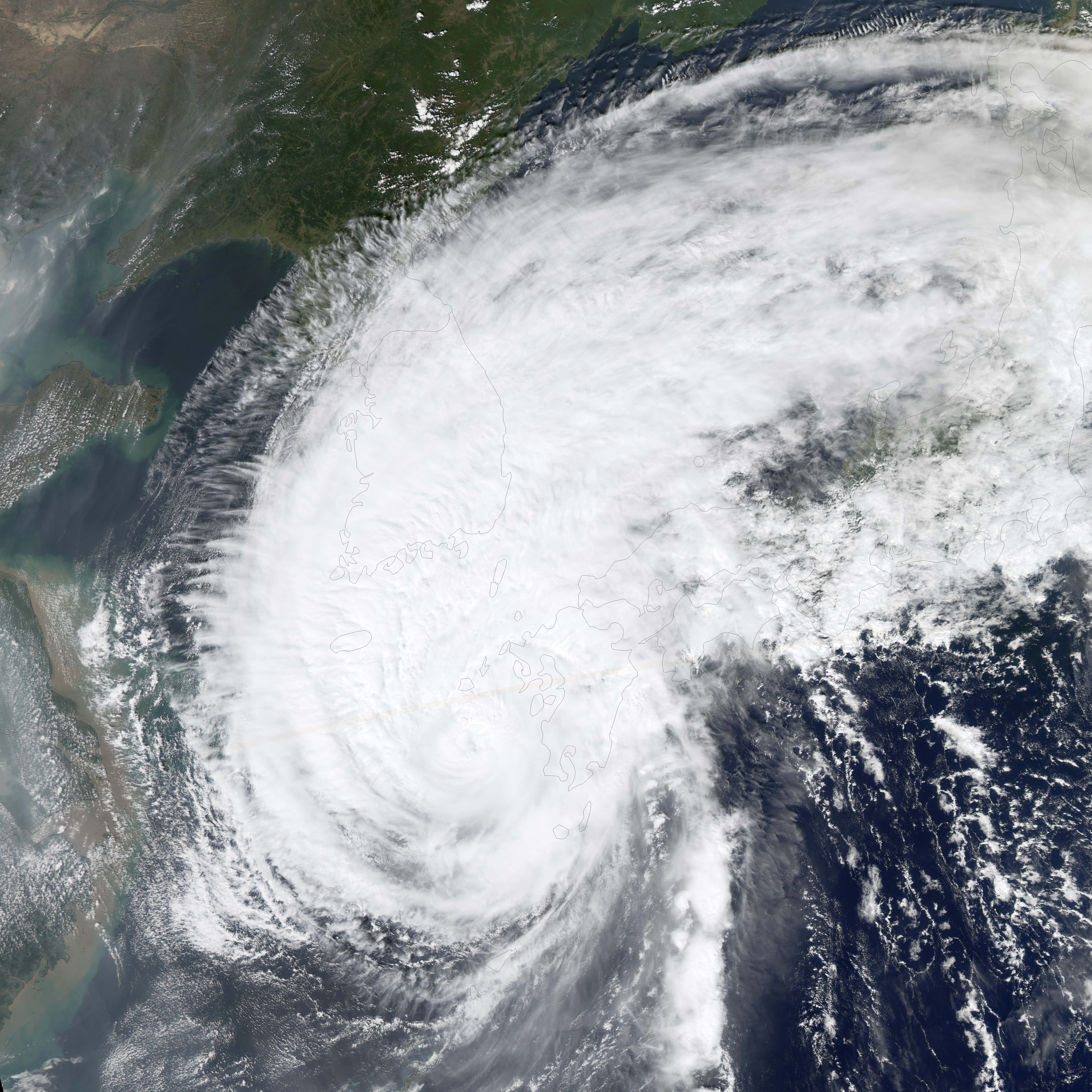
Typhoon Shanshan approaching Kyushu and the Korean Peninsula on September 17

PAGASA issued their final advisory later on September 16. Peak intensity for Typhoon Luis as reported by PAGASA while it was in their area of responsibility was only 80 knots (150 km/h; 92 mph). Shanshan made landfall on September 17 on the island of Kyūshū. The HKO issued their final track forecast on the weakening typhoon later that day as it passed out of their area of responsibility, with the peak intensity while within HKO's area of responsibility set at 185 km/h (115 mph; 100 kn). The JTWC declared the system extratropical shortly after.

The JMA downgraded the typhoon to a severe tropical storm at 0000 UTC September 18. Just before crossing the island of Hokkaidō, according to the JMA's best-track graphic, Severe Tropical Storm Shanshan became extratropical twelve hours later. The extratropical storm was tracked by the JMA in their high seas marine warnings until September 22.

== Preparations ==
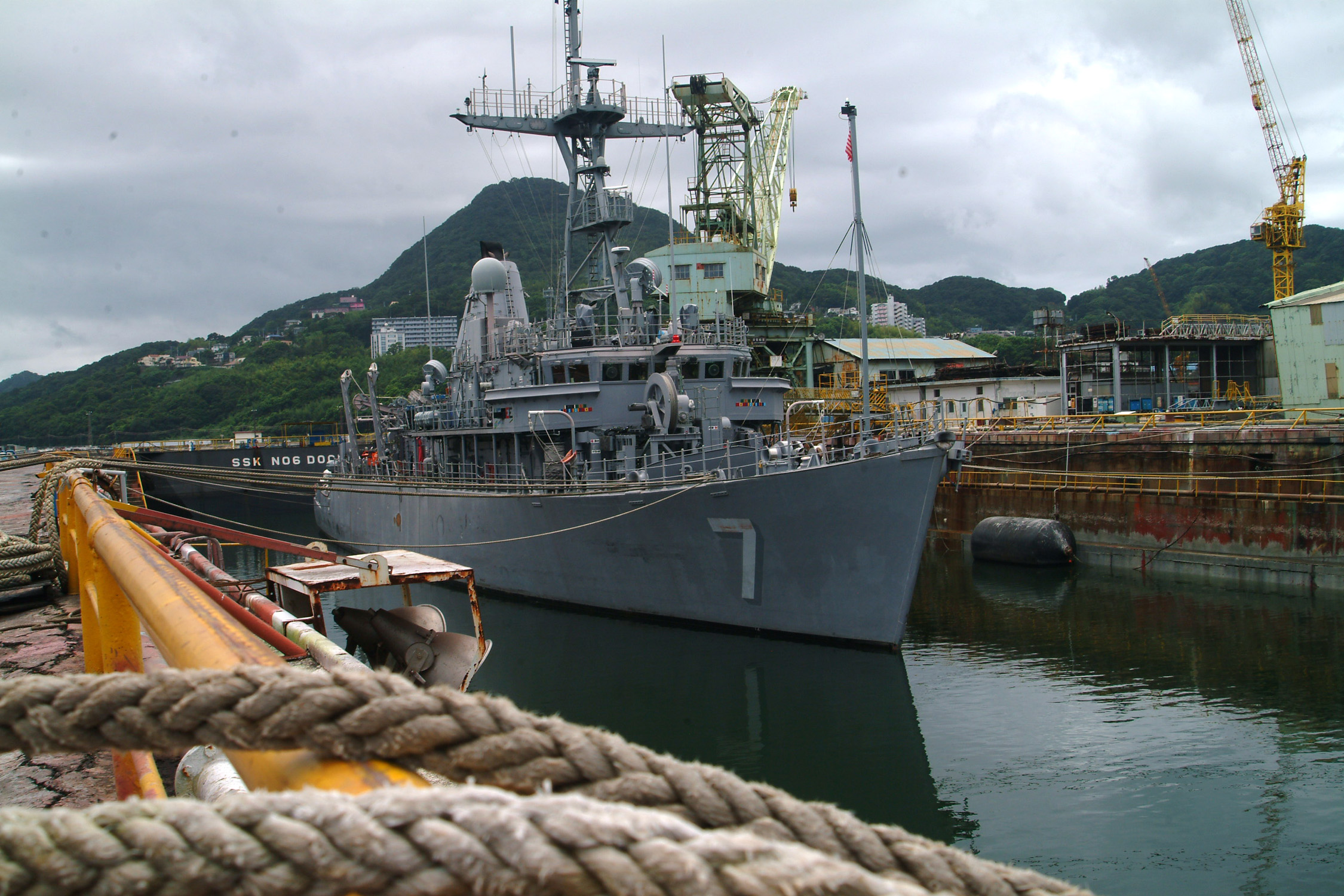
USS Patriot (MCM-7) in a wet berth at Ship's Repair Facility in Sasebo, Japan, taking measures to avoid damage from the incoming Typhoon Shanshan

In anticipation of Typhoon Shanshan, the Taiwan Central Weather Bureau issued a marine warning for all ships in the areas around the north and the east coasts of the island and in the Bashi Channel. Tourists were also asked to avoid the areas due to fears over large waves. The Zhejiang provincial government in the People's Republic of China also asked all fishermen to return to port and ordered local authorities to help with evacuations of people from areas threatened by the typhoon.

In Japan, the United States military and its navy took precautions against the approaching storm. Okinawa was put under Tropical Cyclone Condition of Readiness (TCCOR) 1-E, which means that all outdoor activities are prohibited as there are sustained winds of at least 50 knots (93 km/h; 58 mph) in force, on September 16, with over 100 flights into and out of Naha International Airport on the island cancelled. Kadena Air Base moved various aircraft to other undisclosed locations in the Pacific. Sasebo Naval Base declared TCCOR 1-E on September 17. The USS Harpers Ferry (LSD-49) and USS Juneau (LPD-10) both left the base, while the USS Patriot (MCM-7) was moved to a wet berth. Only one vessel, the USS Tortuga (LSD-46) remained in port for repairs, because authorities thought that the ship could withstand the storm. Elsewhere in Japan, some flights and Shinkansen bullet trains were delayed or cancelled. In Miyazaki and Hiroshima prefectures, evacuation orders were issued for almost 170 families. In Kyūshū, 10,000 people voluntarily evacuated their houses for higher ground. The island's seven main airports were closed, causing 41,900 passengers to be stranded when 357 flights were cancelled. Ahead of an expected landfall on Hokkaidō, the JMA warned residents of the possibility of high winds.

Typhoon warnings were issued for Jeju and the southern and eastern coasts of South Korea ahead of the storm. Passenger ships normally serving Jeju Island remained in port. In Busan, ports were closed, and in Ulsan, 1,600 ships remained in port. In South Gyeongsang Province, authorities banned departures from the port at Tongyeong, stranding over 16,000 fishing boats. The Korean Coast Guard said that a total of 52,000 ships remained at ports across the nation. Mount Jiri was also closed ahead of the storm's passage through Korea, which was expected to bring up to 100 mm (3.9 in) of rain.

== Impact ==
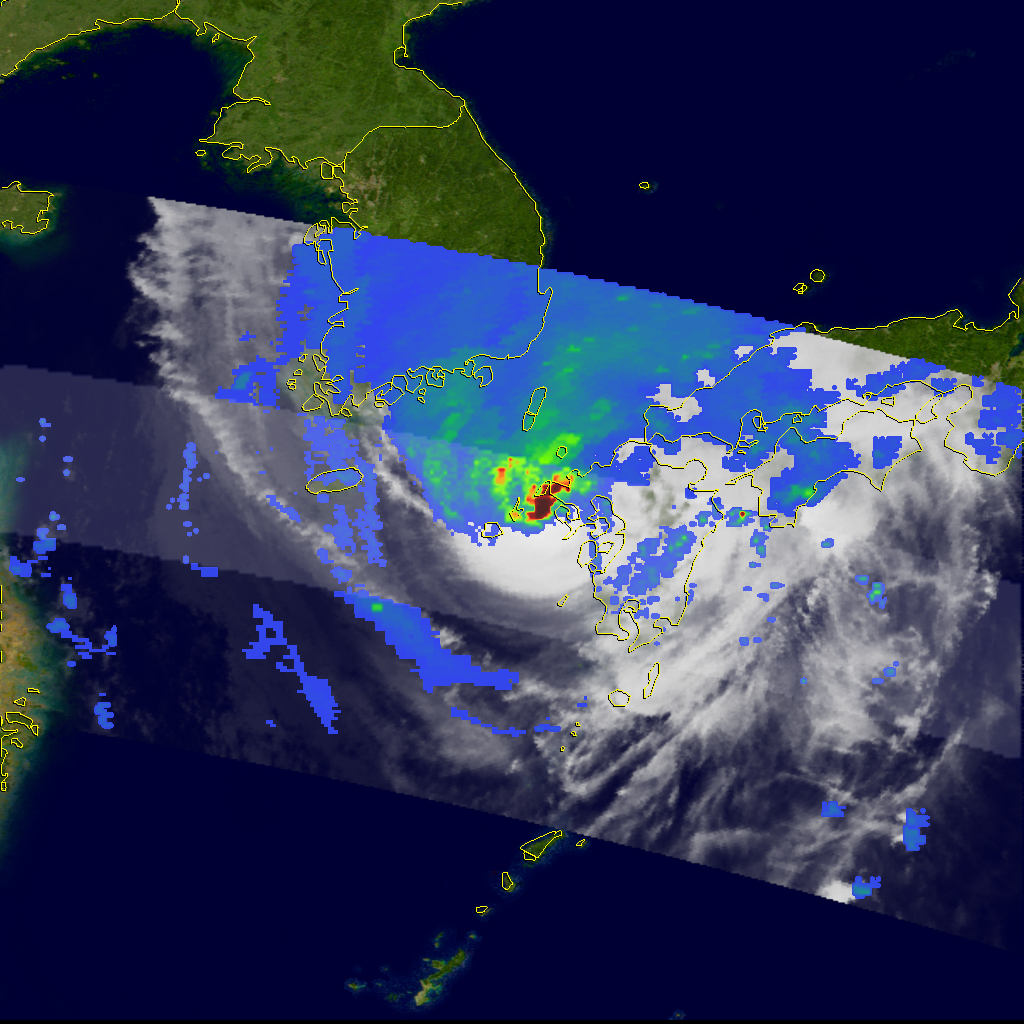
Typhoon Shanshan as seen from the TRMM satellite on September 17

=== South Korea ===
In South Korea, Jeju Island reported 100 mm (3.9 in) of rain by September 16, well before the typhoon hit, while Busan had reported 60 mm (2.4 in). Shanshan knocked out electricity to nearly 4,000 homes in southeastern South Korea. A ship off Ulleungdo sank, but no casualties were reported from that incident. A sailor died when trying to dock boats on Jeju-do.

=== Japan ===
Shanshan's effects on Japan and its outlying Pacific islands were widespread. On Iriomote, a peak gust of 69.9 metres per second (252 km/h; 156 mph) was recorded, the strongest ever on record since records started in 1972. On Ishigaki, Okinawa, a peak gust of 67.0 metres per second (241 km/h; 150 mph) was reported, with rainfall rates of up to 50 mm per hour (2 inches per hour) reported. Over 25,000 homes on Ishigaki lost power after 182 utility poles were downed by the storm, and at least 12 people on the island were injured. Eight vessels were reported to have capsized.

At Kadena Air Base, 2 inches (51 mm) of rain were reported, with a maximum gust of 63 mph (101 km/h) recorded. Naha International Airport on Okinawa reported a recorded maximum wind gust to 70 mph (110 km/h). In Motobu, Okinawa, high waves damaged the local port and swept 30 cargo containers to sea, while in Okinawa City, six injuries were reported. One building in the city suffered a wall collapse, and at least 70 houses were damaged.

Off Kyūshū, a Maldives-registered car ferry capsized, killing one crew member. A train was derailed, possibly due to a tornado, injuring five people. On the island, an electrician in Fukuoka Prefecture died after an industrial container at his firm fell on top of him, crushing him. A glass entrance of a supermarket in Nobeoka broke on impact with flying debris, killing one person. Elsewhere in the prefecture, a 42-year-old man died in his bedroom when it was crushed, while an elderly woman farmer died when she was hit by a fallen tree outside a greenhouse. Three other deaths were confirmed on the island.

Meanwhile, in Hiroshima Prefecture, a 50-year-old firefighter was killed when he drowned after being swept away by rising flood waters. A journalist went missing in similar circumstances, and was found dead a few days later. In all, Typhoon Shanshan killed 11 people and injured over 260 others. Shanshan is also credited with US$4.9 million worth of net losses in the third financial quarter for IPC Holdings, Ltd.

== See also ==
- Other tropical cyclones named Shanshan
- Other tropical cyclones named Luis
- Tropical cyclones in 2006
- Weather of 2006
- Typhoon Tembin (2012)
- Typhoon Bolaven (2012)
