= Tropical Storm Sonamu =

Pacific severe tropical storm in 2013

Severe Tropical Storm Sonamu (Auring)
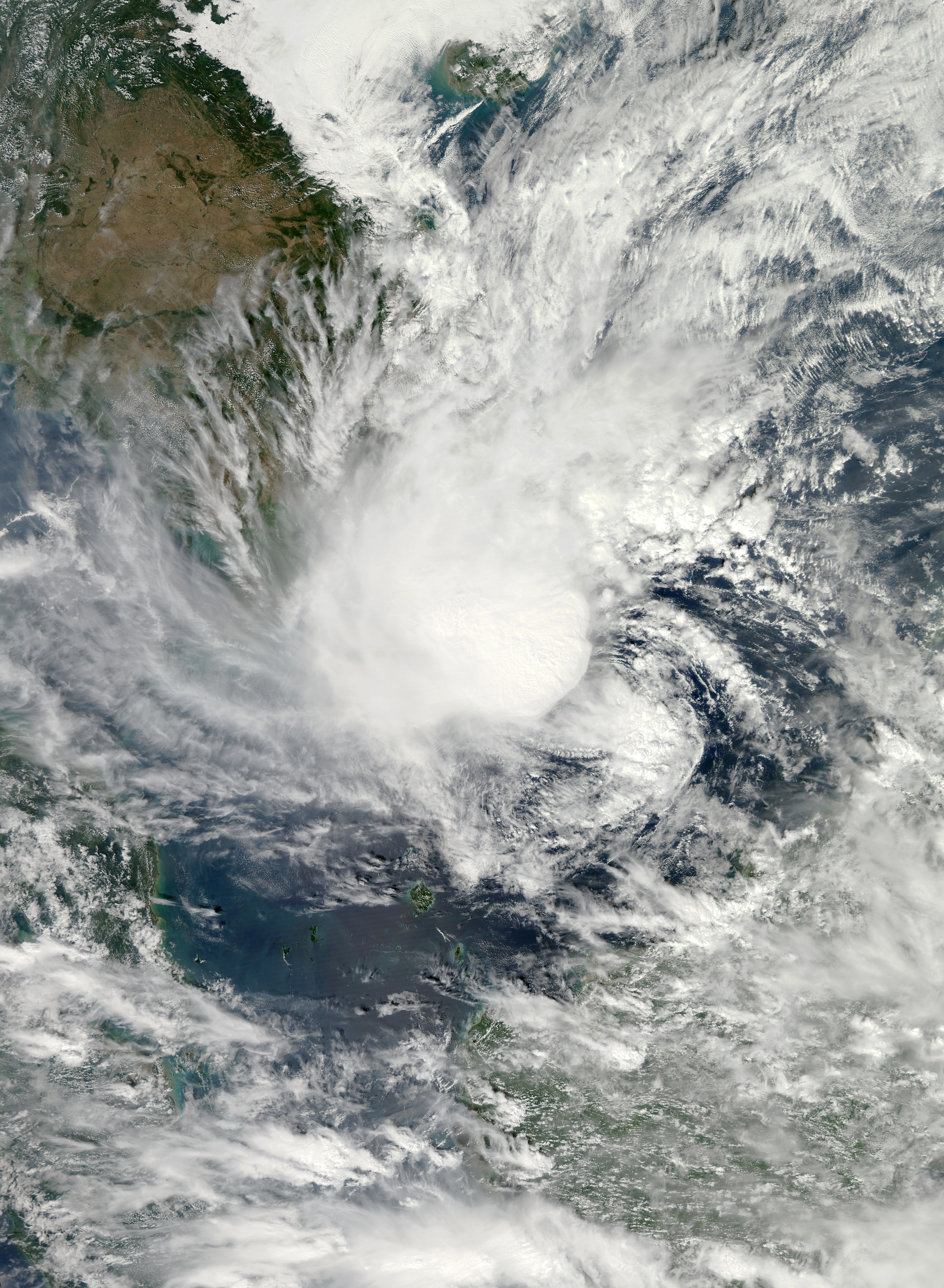
- Sonamu at peak intensity southeast of Vietnam on January 5

Meteorological history
- Formed: January 1, 2013
- Dissipated: January 10, 2013

Severe tropical storm
- 10-minute sustained (JMA)
- Highest winds: 95 km/h (60 mph)
- Lowest pressure: 990 hPa (mbar); 29.23 inHg

Tropical storm
- 1-minute sustained (SSHWS/JTWC)
- Highest winds: 75 km/h (45 mph)
- Lowest pressure: 993 hPa (mbar); 29.32 inHg

Overall effects
- Fatalities: 2 total
- Damage: Minimal
- Areas affected: Philippines, East Malaysia, Riau Archipelago
- IBTrACS /
- Part of the 2013 Pacific typhoon season

Severe Tropical Storm Sonamu, known in the Philippines as Tropical Storm Auring, was a tropical cyclone which brought minor effects in the Philippines and East Malaysia in early January 2013. The first named storm of the 2013 Pacific typhoon season, Sonamu first noted as a tropical depression several hundred miles southwest of the Mariana Islands on January 1. The system tracked west-northwest with no significant development, and it struck Mindanao late on January 2. As the system emerged into the Sulu Sea, it gradually consolidated and became Tropical Storm Sonamu on the next day as it tracked westward. Sonamu emerged into the South China Sea on January 4. Despite marginally favourable environment, Sonamu managed to improve its organization and strengthened to a severe tropical storm on the next day as it turned west-southwest. Environmental condition soon deteriorated, Sonamu weekend to a tropical storm on January 6 and began to slow down. On January 7, Sonamu turned southeastward and weakened further to a tropical depression on the next day. The system drifted slowly to the southeast, and dissipated on January 10, just off the coast of Sarawak.

In the early stage, Sonamu struck the southern Philippines and brought heavy rains, which triggered flooding and landslides. Over 10,000 people were affected by Sonmau, and thousands of people were evacuated to flee from the storm. Transport were disrupted, leaving hundreds of people stranded. Two people were killed and Sonamu injured 12 others, though the storm effects across the country was minimal.

== Meteorological history ==
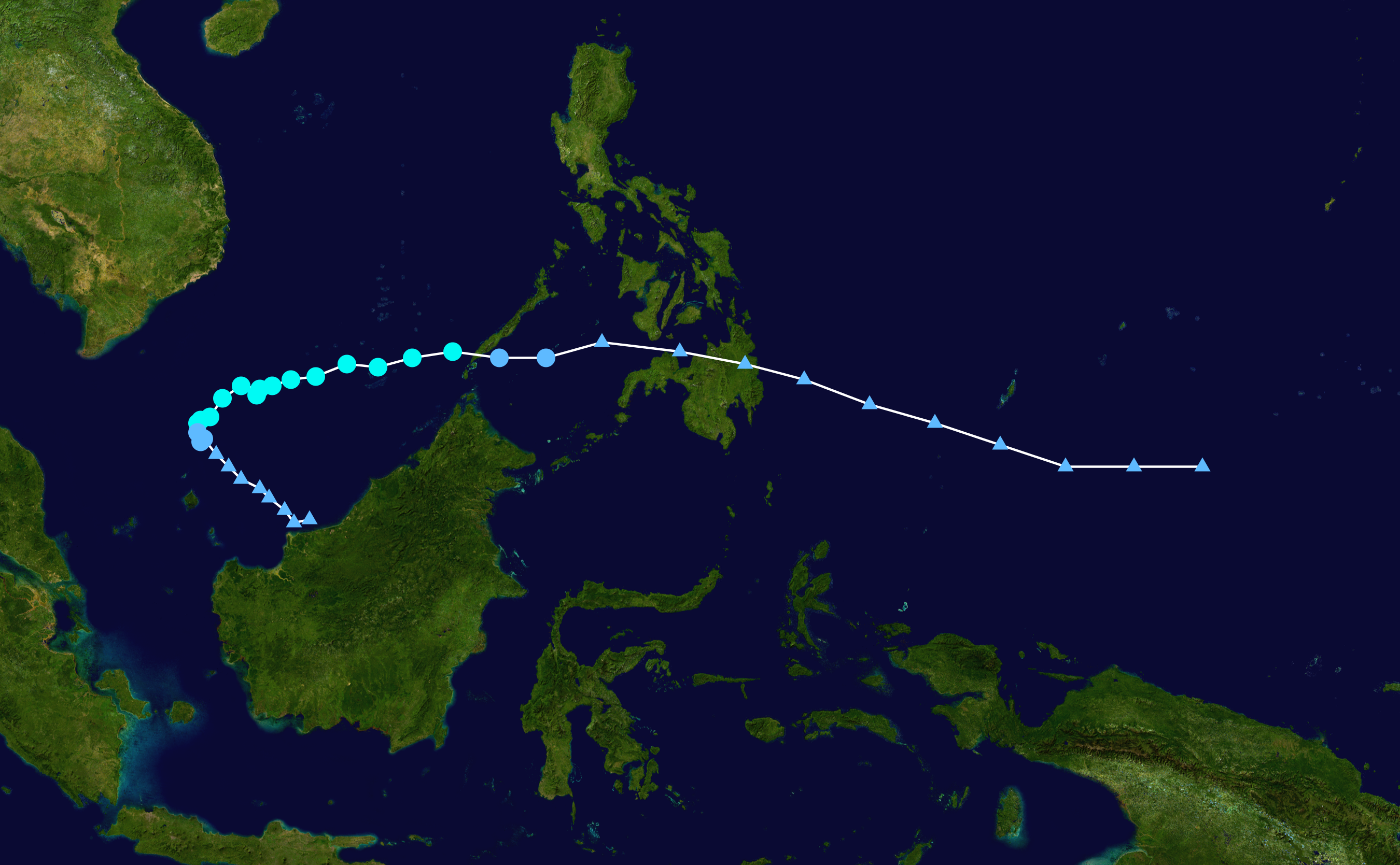
Map plotting the storm's track and intensity, according to the Saffir–Simpson scale Map key Saffir–Simpson scale Tropical depression (≤38 mph, ≤62 km/h) Tropical storm (39–73 mph, 63–118 km/h) Category 1 (74–95 mph, 119–153 km/h) Category 2 (96–110 mph, 154–177 km/h) Category 3 (111–129 mph, 178–208 km/h) Category 4 (130–156 mph, 209–251 km/h) Category 5 (≥157 mph, ≥252 km/h) Unknown Storm type Tropical cyclone Subtropical cyclone Extratropical cyclone, remnant low, tropical disturbance, or monsoon depression

On January 1, the Japan Meteorological Agency (JMA) first noted that a tropical depression formed at about 1,090 km (680 mi) southwest of Guam. The next day, the US-based Joint Typhoon Warning Center (JTWC) also noted an area of convection persisted east of Mindanao. The depression tracked west-northwest and made landfall in Davao Oriental at 12 a.m. PST January 3 (16:00 UTC January 2). (Note: At that time, the PAGASA considered Sonamu as a low-pressure area, though the JMA classified it as a tropical depression.) Despite this, deep convection maintained, which prompted the JTWC to issue a Tropical Cyclone Formation Alert (TCFA). The depression emerged into the Sulu Sea on January 3 and continued to develop. Although situated in a marginal environment with warm waters of 28–30 °C (82–86 °F), strong diffluence and moderate wind shear, the depression continued to develop as a central dense overcast (CDO) formed over the center, and deep convection nearby increased. As such, the JMA upgraded the system to a tropical storm at 12:00 and assigned the name Sonamu. (Note: The name Sonamu (Korean: 소나무, [sʰo̞na̠mu]) was contributed by North Korea and refers to the red pine (Pinus densiflora) in Korean.) At that time, Sonamu was the fourth earliest named storm in the calendic year since reliable records begins in 1951. The JTWC classified the system as a tropical depression three hours later and assigned it as 01W, The Philippine Atmospheric, Geophysical and Astronomical Services Administration (PAGASA) also initiated warnings and assigned the local name Auring. At 4 a.m. PST January 4 (20:00 UTC January 3), Sonamu made landfall at the southern tip of Palawan, near Bataraza, with winds of 65 km/h (40 mph).

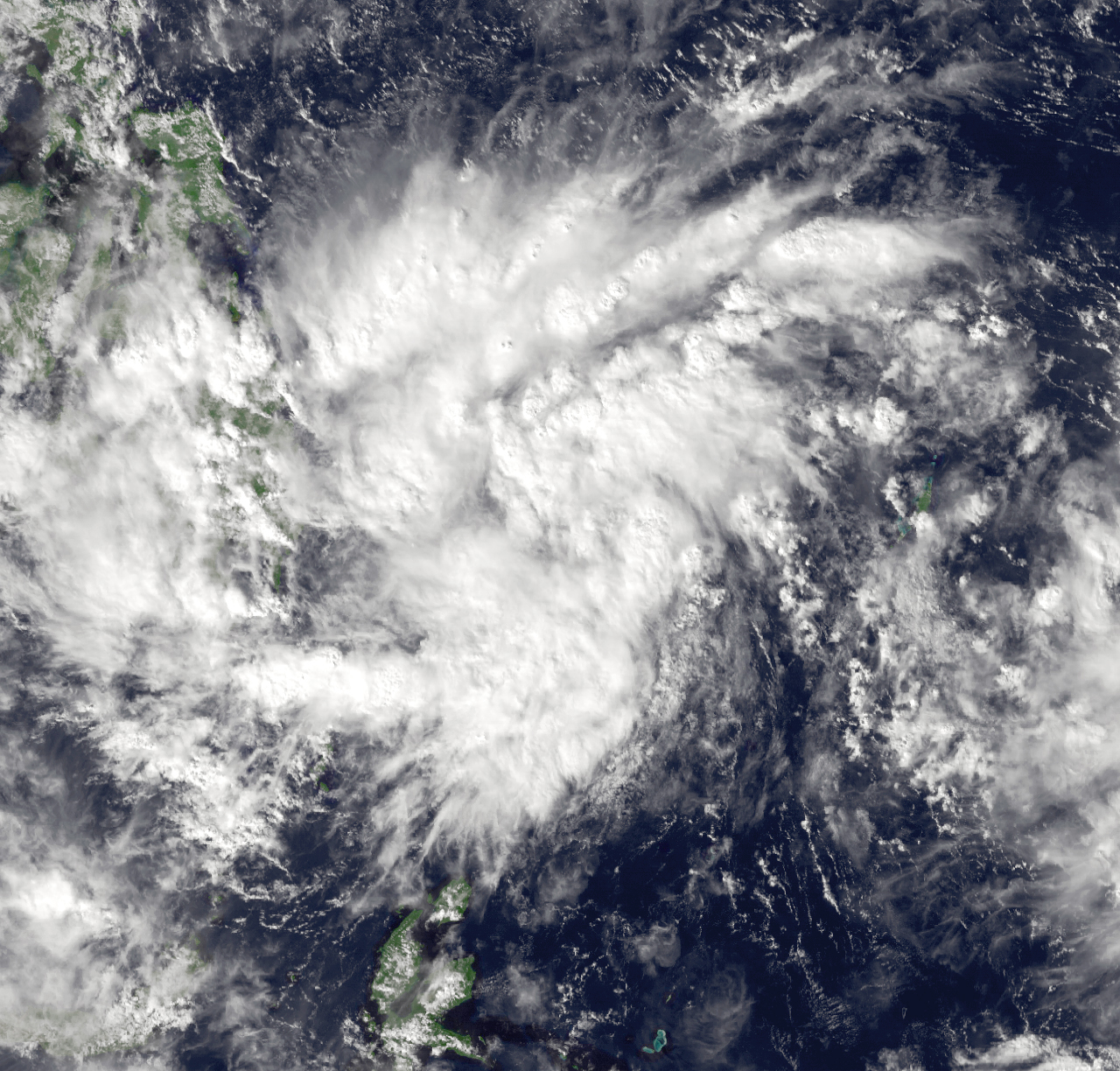
Tropical Depression Sonamu approaching Mindanao on January 2

On January 4, the JTWC upgraded it to a tropical storm as it tracked westward and emerged into the South China Sea. The PAGASA issued the final advisory as Sonamu exited the Philippine Area of Responsibility (PAR). Environmental conditions remained marginally favourable, as the center became partly exposed due to strong wind shear. Nonetheless, the JMA further upgrade Sonamu to a severe tropical storm early on January 5, as it turned west-southwest under the influence of a subtropical ridge to its north. Concurrently, Sonamu attained its peak intensity with peak winds of 95 km/h (60 mph). Good poleward outflow offset the effects of wind shear, and the convection was burst over the southwestern quadrant of Sonamu. Wind shear along with dry air from the northeast monsoon continued to affect Sonamu, and the center became ragged and exposed with deep convection sheared to the northwest, which prompted the JMA to downgraded it to a tropical storm on January 7 Despite unfavourable condition, deep convection continued to burst over the southern part of Sonamu, which slowed down its weakening trend. However, the burst was short-lived, as Sonamu moved to water with only 26 °C (79 °F), and the center soon exposed again. Situated between two subtropical ridges, the steering current became weak, which caused Soamu to slow down and began to drift southeastward. The JTWC downgraded Sonamu to a tropical depression at 15:00 UTC. At 00:00 UTC January 8, the JMA also downgraded Sonamu to a tropical depression, though the JTWC upgraded it to a tropical storm at 03:00 UTC, as a CDO was formed again and obscured the center. Nonetheless, the center soon became ill-definied, which prompted the JTWC to downgraded Sonamu to a tropical depression again just six hours later. The JTWC soon issued the final warnings, but the JMA still maintained Sonamu at tropical depression status, as isolated convection continued to burst to the west of the center. Sonamu dissipated on January 10 just off the coast of Sarawak, about 45 km (28 mi) north of Mukah.

== Preparations and impact ==
Shortly after being classified as tropical depression, the PAGASA issued the PSWS #1 for Lanao del Sur, provinces in Northern Mindanao, Zamboanga Peninsula, Negros Island Region and Palawan. Late on January 3, the PAGASA raised the PSWS of southern Palawan to #2 as Sonamu strengthened to a tropical storm, while the remaining part of the province was still under PSWS #1. All the PSWS were cancelled on the next day as Sonamu exited the PAR and moved away from the country.

Sonamu brought rainfalls to Mindanao and Visayas. Authorities warned for potential flooding and landslides that affected the region. 1,405 people were evacuated in Valencia, Bukidnon, Dipolog and Palawan in advance of the storm. Another 500 people were evacuated in Quezon, Bukidnon. Hundreds of people were stranded, as watercraft services in western Mindanao were suspended. Two houses in Roxas, Palawan were destroyed. Domestic flights in Pagadian were cancelled. Sea vessels were not allowed to entered the open waters in the Zamboanga peninsula. In Kapalong, Davao del Norte, a teenager boy was swept away by a raving waters and was declared missing. In Dumaguete, a ship went aground after winds of 34 km/h (21 mph) broke the mooring ties. 228 people on the ship were rescued. Two people were killed by Sonamu. A man died in Rizal, Palawan after being hit by a fallen tree. Another person were drowned in Bataraza. The storm also injured 12 others, all in Palawan. 10,597 people were affected by Sonamu. 185 houses were damaged during the storm, in which 63 of them were destroyed. However, overall effects across the country was minimal.

As Sonamu approached the coast of Malaysia, the country felt waves of up to 2.2 m (7.2 ft) from the storm.

== Retirement ==
In February 2014, the Typhoon Committee announced that the name Sonamu would be removed from the naming list, because the pronunciation of the name is similar to "tsunami", which triggered fear in Malaysia. In 2015, the name was replaced by Jongdari which is the Korean name of skylark.

== See also ==
- List of near-Equatorial tropical cyclones
- Tropical Storm Tess (1988)
- Tropical Storm Shanshan (2013)
- Typhoon Tembin
- Tropical Storm Sanba (2018)
