= Hurricane Alice (June 1954) =

Category 2 Atlantic hurricane in June 1954

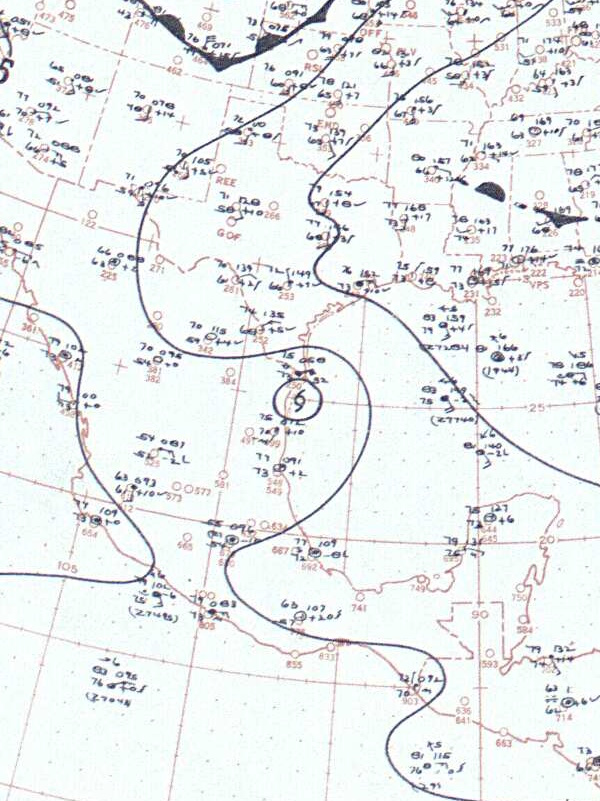
- Surface weather analysis map showing Alice on June 25

Meteorological history
- Formed: June 24, 1954
- Dissipated: June 26, 1954

Category 2 hurricane
- 1-minute sustained (SSHWS/NWS)
- Highest winds: 110 mph (175 km/h)
- Lowest pressure: ≤975 mbar (hPa); ≤28.79 inHg

Overall effects
- Fatalities: 55–153
- Damage: $2 million (1954 USD) (partial estimate)
- Areas affected: Mexico, Texas
- IBTrACS
- Part of the 1954 Atlantic hurricane season

Hurricane Alice was the second-strongest Atlantic hurricane to make landfall in the month of June since reliable records began in the 1850s. The storm was linked to catastrophic flooding in southern Texas and northern Mexico, especially along the Rio Grande and its tributaries. The third tropical cyclone and first hurricane of the 1954 Atlantic hurricane season, Alice was one of two storms to receive the same name that year, the other being an unusual post-season hurricane that persisted into the new year of 1955, becoming one of only two January hurricanes on record (the other having formed in 1938). The first Alice developed rather suddenly on June 24 over the Bay of Campeche, though it may well have formed earlier but went undetected due to limited surface weather observations. Moving northwestward, Alice strengthened rapidly as it neared the Mexican coastline, becoming a hurricane early the next day. By midday on June 25, the hurricane reached peak winds of 110 miles per hour (177 km/h) before moving inland well south of the U.S.–Mexico border. The storm struck an area with few inhabitants and caused relatively minimal impacts from wind near the point of landfall and in southern Texas.

As it moved inland, however, Alice produced prolific rains along and near the Rio Grande, resulting in some of the worst flooding ever seen in parts of northern Mexico and southern Texas; in some areas, the flooding amounted to a one-in-1,000-year event. The Pecos River crested at 96.24 ft (29.33 m), which joined with the Rio Grande to produce significant flooding. The floods destroyed bridges and dikes and flooded many cities along the inner reaches of the river, which reached its highest water levels since 1865. As the river overflowed its banks, floods breached the dikes at Piedras Negras, Coahuila, destroying large sections of the town. Other communities in Mexico reported significant flood damage. In the United States, damage was heaviest in Ozona, Texas, where the floods killed 15 people and caused $2 million in damage (1954 USD). Rainfall peaked at over 24.07 in (611 mm), most of which fell in a 24‑hour period. In all, flooding from Hurricane Alice killed at least 55 people, including 17 in the U.S. and 38 in Mexico, though many deaths in rural Mexico may have gone unreported; the total death toll could have exceeded 150.

== Meteorological history ==
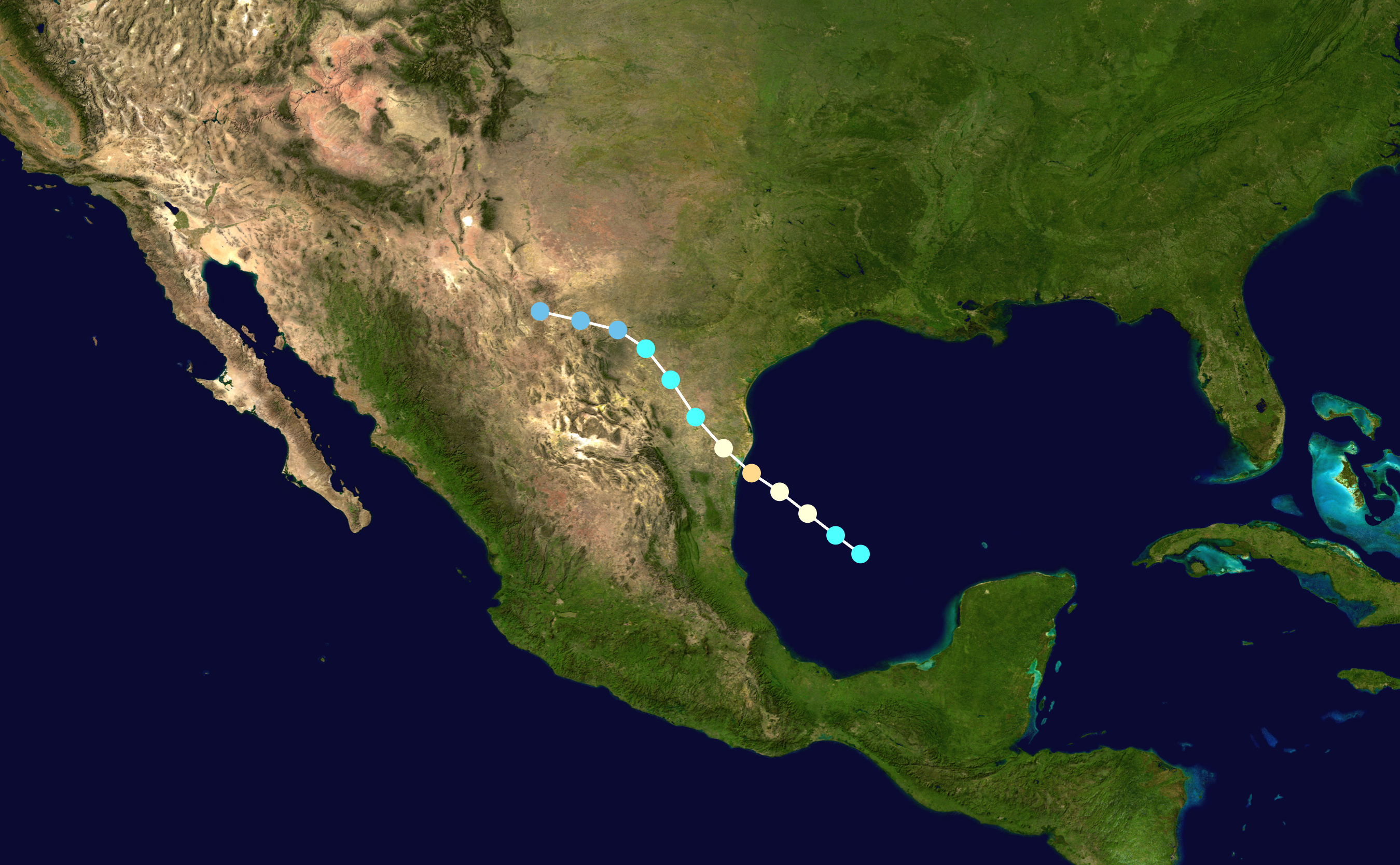
Map plotting the storm's track and intensity, according to the Saffir–Simpson scale Map key Saffir–Simpson scale Tropical depression (≤38 mph, ≤62 km/h) Tropical storm (39–73 mph, 63–118 km/h) Category 1 (74–95 mph, 119–153 km/h) Category 2 (96–110 mph, 154–177 km/h) Category 3 (111–129 mph, 178–208 km/h) Category 4 (130–156 mph, 209–251 km/h) Category 5 (≥157 mph, ≥252 km/h) Unknown Storm type Tropical cyclone Subtropical cyclone Extratropical cyclone, remnant low, tropical disturbance, or monsoon depression

At 12:00 UTC on June 24, 1954, a moderate tropical storm formed about 270 miles (435 km) east of Tampico, Tamaulipas, with winds of 60 miles per hour (97 km/h). In 2015, NOAA researchers working on reanalysis with the Hurricane Research Division examined observations to determine whether Alice formed earlier, but were unsuccessful due to sparse surface weather observations over the Bay of Campeche. The first observation of gale-force winds occurred at 18:00 UTC on June 24, when a ship reported 60-mile-per-hour (97 km/h) winds and an atmospheric pressure of 999 millibars (29.50 inHg), indicating a well-developed cyclone in the area. Based on these data, scientists concluded that Alice likely formed earlier than indicated, but went undetected until that day. Regardless, Alice steadily intensified almost immediately upon detection as it headed northwestward, strengthening into the equivalent of a Category 1 hurricane on the Saffir-Simpson hurricane wind scale by 00:00 UTC on June 25. Early on that day, a ship calibrated the rapid strengthening of the storm, measuring winds of 85 mph (137 km/h) at 08:17 UTC. As Alice neared the coast of Mexico, reconnaissance aircraft known as Hurricane Hunters began tracking the eye of the hurricane, but apparently did not penetrate the center of the storm. They did, however, provide information about the position of the storm.

The storm continued to intensify rapidly as it approached the coastline south of the United States–Mexico border. Based on aircraft observations, research suggests that Alice made landfall about 60 mi (97 km) south of Matamoros, Tamaulipas, at 14:00 UTC on June 25. The storm affected a thinly populated segment of the Mexican coastline, and few observations were available to determine the strength of the hurricane. One report, taken about 100 mi (161 km) south of Brownsville, Texas, suggested top winds of at least 70 to 80 mph (113 to 129 km/h). Prior to scientific reexamination, HURDAT—the official database containing tracks and intensities of cyclones in the North Atlantic and Eastern North Pacific regions—listed top winds of 80 mph (129 km/h) at landfall in Mexico. However, a radiosonde, launched from Brownsville in time for the 12:00 UTC observation, recorded winds of 150 mph (241 km/h) from the southeast at 3,000 feet (914 m) in elevation. Based on this measurement, which may have represented winds in the eyewall, researchers determined that Hurricane Alice was likely significantly stronger at landfall than previously assessed. They analyzed Alice as having struck Mexico with winds of 110 mph (177 km/h), while noting the great uncertainty and the possibility that the storm may have even been much stronger than this. The central pressure in the eye was probably 975 mb (28.79 inHg) or lower, as corroborated by observations well inland in Texas. Therefore, Alice was at least equivalent to a high-end Category 2 hurricane at landfall and conceivably could have attained major hurricane status.

After landing, Hurricane Alice gradually weakened as it approximately followed the Rio Grande, crossing into southern Texas near La Grulla just before 00:00 UTC on June 26. The storm by then had weakened back to a moderate tropical storm with winds of 60 mph (97 km/h), but it still produced gale-force winds in several communities across southern Texas; a few areas in Texas may have even experienced hurricane-force winds for brief periods before the storm entered the state, but there are no observations to confirm such winds. The storm likely caused winds of at least 70 mph (113 km/h) in southern Texas. As it crossed into Texas, Tropical Storm Alice curved more to the north-northwest early on June 26 before assuming a sharp bend back westward later in the day. The storm degenerated into a tropical depression by 18:00 UTC and dissipated early on June 27 near the Big Bend National Park in Texas.

== Impact ==
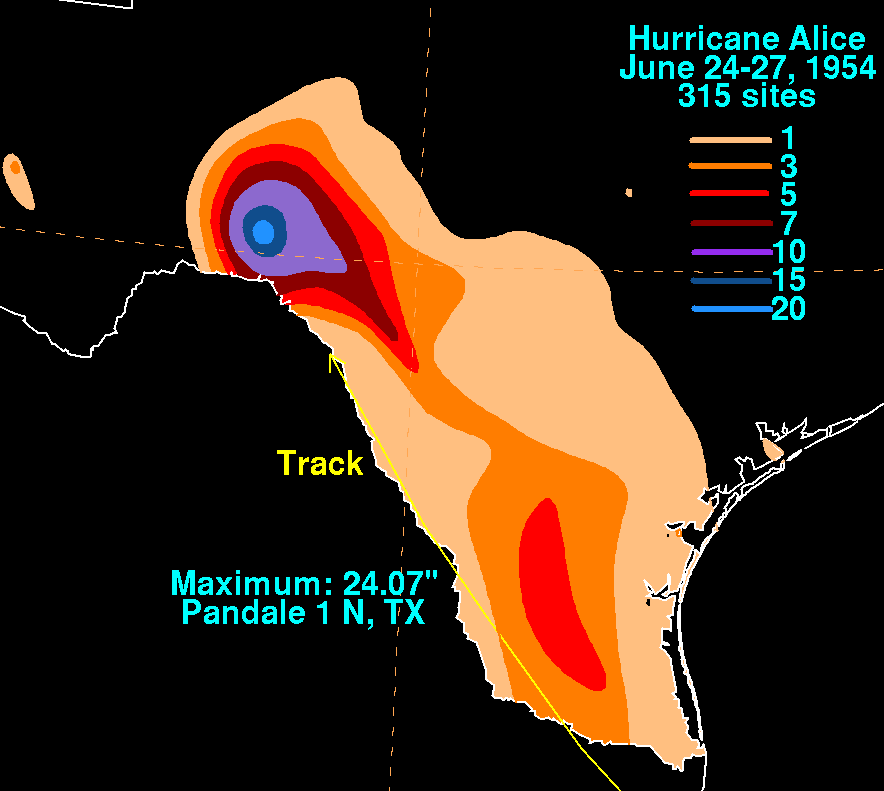
Storm total rainfall from Hurricane Alice in the United States

Before Alice moved ashore, about 50 Girl Scouts at a camp were evacuated to a center in Brownsville, Texas. The residents of Padre Island were also evacuated. Residents in the storm's path were unprepared due to the storm forming suddenly. The United States Coast Guard spread the word about the storm by traversing the coast and advising residents to seek shelter. Officials at the U.S. Weather Bureau posted northwest storm warnings for the Brownsville area, recommending that small boats to stay at harbor. Damages along the coastline at the point of landfall were relatively light. Winds in Brownsville reached 62 mph (100 km/h), which created flying debris that injured one man. Moderate to strong gales affected the Rio Grande Valley inland over southern Texas. Across the border, minor damage was reported in Matamoros, Tamaulipas, and one person there was killed by a fallen power line. A few shrimp fishing boats were driven ashore by heavy winds. Although later there was severe flooding further inland, a dam along the Rio Grande prevented significant flooding in the Brownsville area.

Most of the damage resulting from Alice was caused by heavy rain in the inland areas of Texas, Tamaulipas and Coahuila; damage was exacerbated in these areas by drought conditions that rendered the soil especially vulnerable to erosion. Estimates of peak rainfall within 12 hours vary from 22 inches (56 cm) to 26 inches (132 cm), and a total of 35 inches (89 cm) of rain fell in 24 hours, approaching the world record that had been set by an unnamed hurricane in Texas in 1921. However, a 2010 report on the storm's rainfall indicated a maximum of 24.07 in (611 mm) near Pandale, of which 16.02 in (407 mm) fell in a 24‑hour period.

The peak rainfall occurred in a small area centered near the Pecos River. A location along the Johnson Draw reported 11 in (280 mm) of rainfall after receiving minimal precipitation in the previous three years. In addition, some locals in western Texas experienced rainfall from Alice that exceed yearly averages. This contributed to significant flooding along the Pecos River, reaching a flood stage of 55 ft (17 m) in Pandale. The flooding swept away a group of fishermen in Sheffield as well as at a location 10 mi (16 km) north of Pandale, killing four. Downstream, the river crested at 96.24 ft (29.33 m), which washed out a highway and three railroad bridges. A temporary bridge was built between Eagle Pass and Piedro Negro by July 10, or two weeks after the storm. The destroyed rail lines stranded a Sunset Limited train, which prompted the passengers to evacuate to nearby Langtry. The flooding also stranded a Southern Pacific train, whose occupants were later evacuated by helicopters. The peak river crest corresponded to a discharge rate of 948,000 ft³/s (26,800 m³/s), which the International Boundary and Water Commission remarked was "probably the greatest rate of runoff for a watershed of [that] size in the United States". Heavy rain fell across all of southern Texas and northern Mexico as a result of Alice, causing flash floods in inland areas. Ozona, Texas was the town most affected by the floods, sustaining $2 million in damage (1954 USD), as well as 15 deaths. Early on the morning of June 25, a "wall of water" as high as 30 feet (9.2 m) poured out of a dry gully and overwhelmed most of the town. Roughly a third of Ozona had to be evacuated, and many livestock there were killed. About 500 families were left homeless in the town. United States military helicopters worked to rescue people trapped by the floodwaters. In all, at least seven towns experienced flooding from the storm on either side of the border, including Lamesa and Laredo, Texas which were badly damaged by flash floods.

The Rio Grande rose well above flood level at the cities of Eagle Pass, Texas and Piedras Negras, Coahuila. While the city of Eagle Pass was evacuated, Piedras Negras was not. Both cities were completely flooded, and the dike intended to protect Piedras Negras from floods was washed away. At least 38 people (some sources say 39) were killed in Piedras Negras after the dike collapsed. In Eagle Pass, the commercial sector was flooded by over 8 ft (2.4 m) of waters, which let heavy losses. Before the storm began producing heavy rainfall, officials anticipated moderate river flooding that would peak at less than the flood of 1948. The river crested at Laredo, Texas, where waters reached a peak of 62.2 feet (19 m), at least 10 feet (3 m) above the previous record flood. High waters caused the water treatment plants to fail there, which prevented the safe delivery of fresh water until July 1. The International Bridge connecting Laredo and Nuevo Laredo was swept away. Although severe damage occurred in the latter city, no deaths were recorded in either city due to evacuations. Flooding along the Rio Grande was the highest since 1865, and was considered a 1 in 2000 year event. About 12,000 people were evacuated from nearby Ciudad Acuña following the flood. There, the floods left heavy damage.

Estimates for total death toll range from 55 to 153. Death toll estimates for Texas range from 17 to 38, though official records indicate that the 38 deaths occurred in Mexico rather than Texas. Estimates of the deaths in Mexico, where records are less complete, vary more widely. Several of the deaths in Texas were homeless people attempting to enter the United States, and as a result their deaths were not counted. Monetary damage figures are not available, but it is known that flooding from Alice caused considerable damage to crops, primarily cotton.

== Aftermath and records ==
While Alice left almost unprecedented flooding in its wake, the storm itself was not an unheard-of occurrence: a similar storm in 1921, which followed a comparative track, caused significant flooding in Texas as well, albeit not in the same areas affected by the floods of 1954. Following the devastation left by Alice, members of the U.S. Air Force, Navy, and Army flew 21 helicopters with over 81 tons of relief supplies to the affected people of Mexico and Texas, including food, water, medicine, and clothing. The disastrous flooding caused by Hurricane Alice along the Rio Grande accelerated the joint US–Mexico Amistad Dam project, a series of flood control dams designed to prevent similar catastrophes in the future. The project, in the planning stages for decades before the storm, was finally begun in 1960.

Leftover waters from the storm led to an increase in mosquitoes in Texas, which prompted a widespread application of larvicide via airplane. On July 1, the flood areas of southern Texas were declared a major disaster area. This followed a delivery of 2 flood specialists, 20 laborers, 2 portable water treatment plants, 7 trucks, and a quantity of insecticides and water treatment tablets. Residents in Laredo, Texas provided citizens of its neighboring city Nuevo Laredo, Mexico with food and water. The Mexican government provided temporary homes for the affected citizens of the flood. American officials distributed typhoid vaccinations, water purification tablets, and insecticides to the American cities along the Rio Grande. Safe water was eventually restored to Laredo, Texas on July 12. All emergency work related to the disaster was finished by September 3.

Besides flooding, Hurricane Alice was also notable for another reason: it made landfall with some of the strongest winds in a June hurricane on record. With top winds of 110 mph (177 km/h), the cyclone was the second-strongest Atlantic hurricane to make landfall in the month of June, behind only Hurricane Audrey in 1957, which made landfall in Louisiana with winds of 125 mph (201 km/h). The storm was somewhat analogous to Hurricane Alex, which also affected the same region in 2010 with winds of 110 mph (177 km/h), though Alex made landfall in early July.

== See also ==
- Other storms of the same name
- List of Category 2 Atlantic hurricanes
- Hurricane Alex (2010)
