= Tropical Storm Shanshan (2013) =

2013 Pacific tropical storm

Tropical Storm Shanshan (Crising)
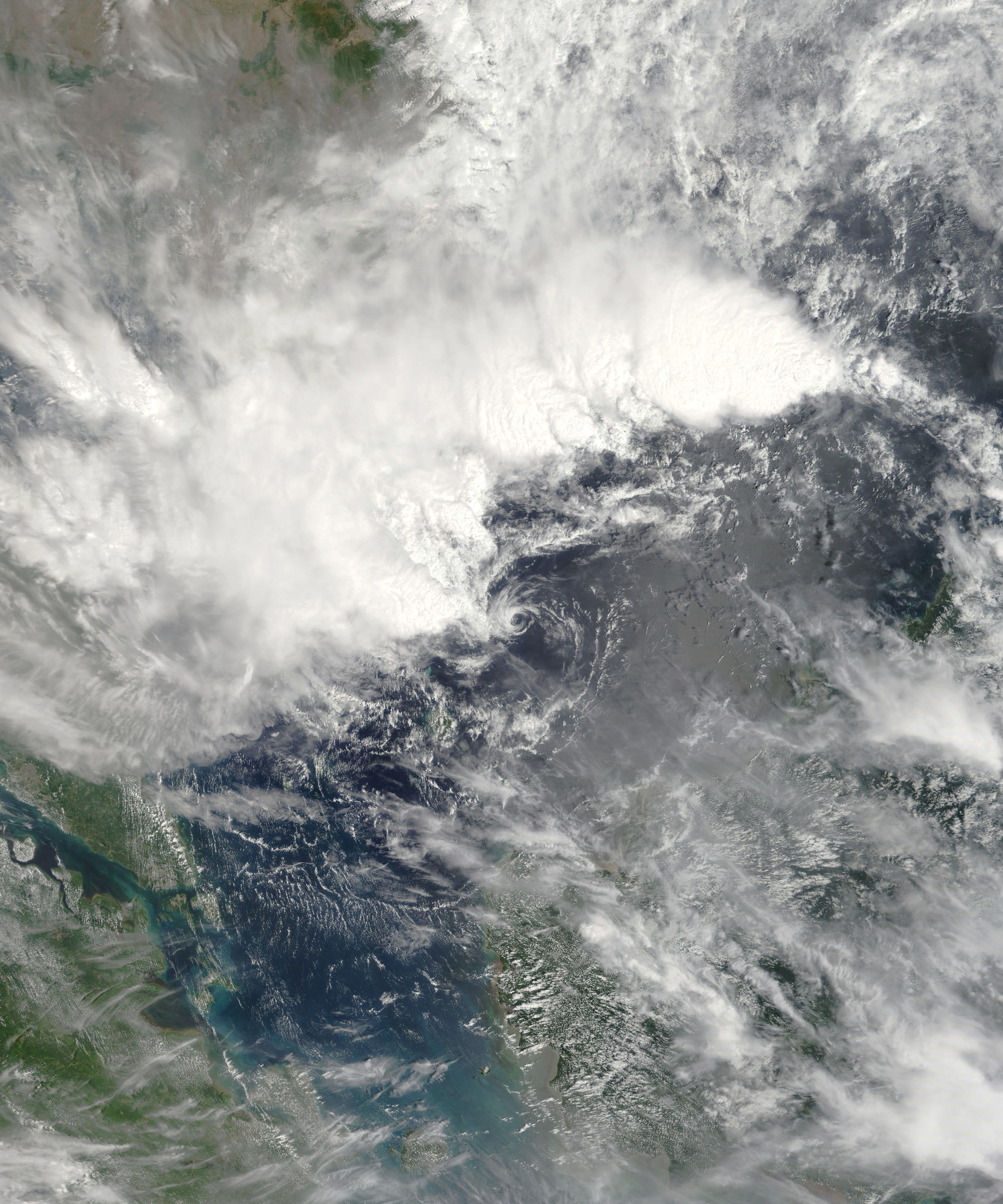
- Tropical Storm Shanshan near peak intensity on February 22

Meteorological history
- Formed: February 18, 2013
- Dissipated: February 23, 2013

Tropical storm
- 10-minute sustained (JMA)
- Highest winds: 65 km/h (40 mph)
- Lowest pressure: 1002 hPa (mbar); 29.59 inHg

Tropical depression
- 1-minute sustained (SSHWS/JTWC)
- Highest winds: 45 km/h (30 mph)
- Lowest pressure: 1004 hPa (mbar); 29.65 inHg

Overall effects
- Casualties: 11 dead, 2 missing
- Damage: $275,000 (2013 USD)
- Areas affected: Philippines, East Malaysia, Riau Archipelago
- IBTrACS /
- Part of the 2013 Pacific typhoon season

Tropical Storm Shanshan, (Note: The name Shanshan (Cantonese: 珊珊, [saːn˥ saːn˥]) was contributed by Hong Kong and is a feminine given nickname meaning "sparkling" in Cantonese and was also named after Lee Lai-shan, commemorating the first athlete to win an Olympic medal representing Hong Kong.) known in the Philippines as Tropical Depression Crising, was a weak tropical cyclone which affected the southern Philippines in mid February 2013. The second named storm of the 2013 Pacific typhoon season, Shanshan developed from a tropical depression on February 18 while located northeast of the Morotai Island. Environmental conditions were marginally favourable that it remained a weak tropical depression while moving west-northwest. The depression struck Mindanao and Palawan on February 19–20, before emerged into the South China Sea. Despite environmental conditions remained marginally favourable, the system briefly achieved tropical storm status late on February 21, and received the name Shanshan. Conditions soon deteriorated, Shanshan weakened back to a tropical depression on the next day and dissipated on February 23.

Although Shanshan remained weak when striking the Philippines, it still brought rainfall and caused flooding and landslides. Provinces across Mindanao and Palawan were placed under PSWS #1. More than 300,000 people were evacuated. Schools were closed in advance of the storm. The NDRRMC reported that 11 people were killed, four were injured and two others were missing, and the damage across the country amounted to Php11.2 million (US$275 thousand).

== Meteorological history ==
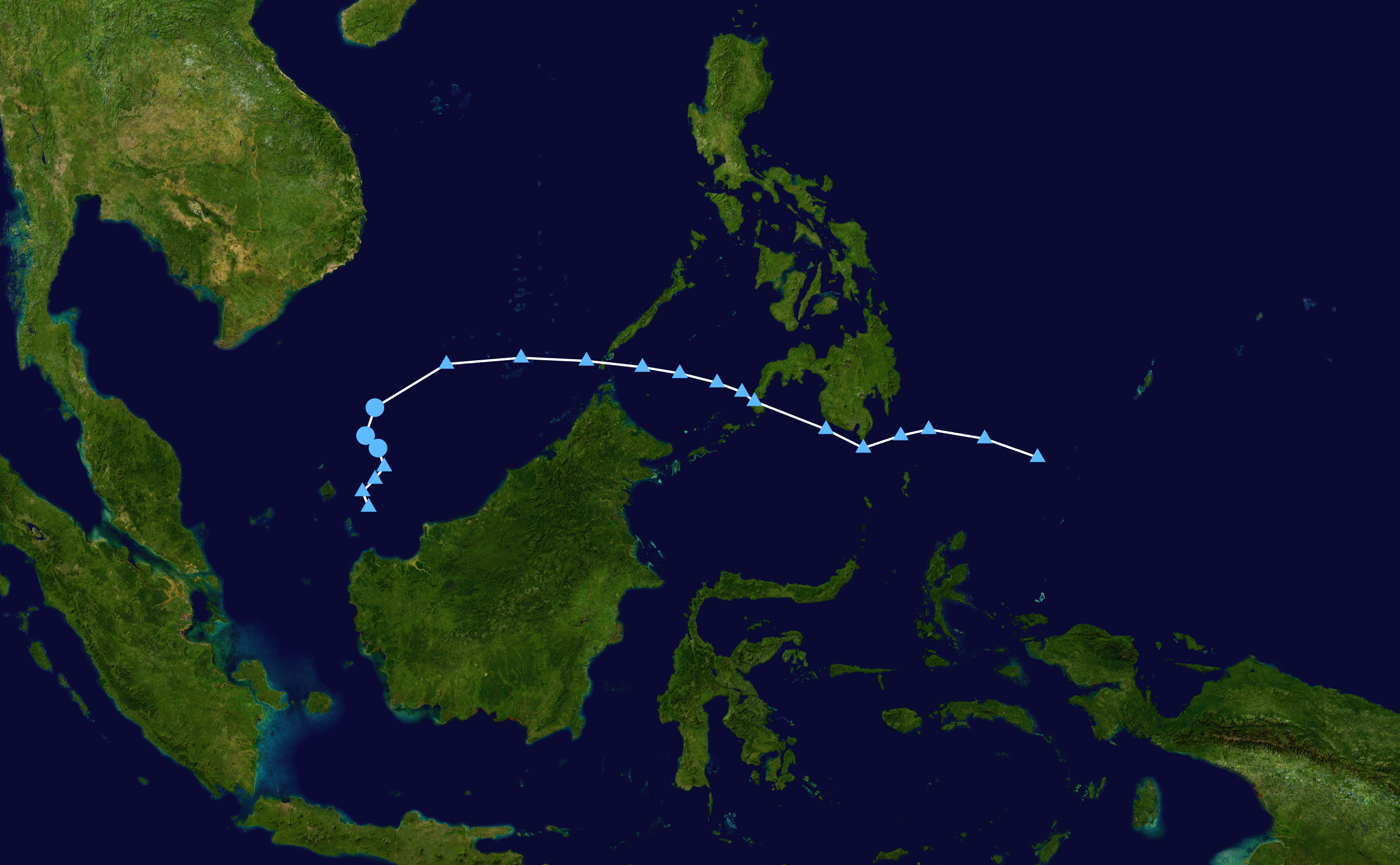
Map plotting the storm's track and intensity, according to the Saffir–Simpson scale Map key Saffir–Simpson scale Tropical depression (≤38 mph, ≤62 km/h) Tropical storm (39–73 mph, 63–118 km/h) Category 1 (74–95 mph, 119–153 km/h) Category 2 (96–110 mph, 154–177 km/h) Category 3 (111–129 mph, 178–208 km/h) Category 4 (130–156 mph, 209–251 km/h) Category 5 (≥157 mph, ≥252 km/h) Unknown Storm type Tropical cyclone Subtropical cyclone Extratropical cyclone, remnant low, tropical disturbance, or monsoon depression

On February 18, the Japan Meteorological Agency (JMA) noted a tropical depression formed about 410 km (250 mi) northeast of the Morotai Island. The Philippine Atmospheric, Geophysical and Astronomical Services Administration (PAGASA) followed suit on the same day and assigned the local name Crising. The next day, the Joint Typhoon Warning Center (JTWC) also initinated advisories to Tropical Depression 02W. The system could only remained as a weak tropical depression due to moderate wind shear as it was tracking west-northwest, steered by a subtropical ridge. At 13:00 PST (05:00 UTC), Crising made landfall at the southern tip of Davao del Sur and emerged into the Celebes Sea. Crising later passed near Zamboanga City and emerged into the Sulu Sea. Deep convection were sheared to the northwest as wind shear continued to affect the system. The depression continued to move west-northwest under the influence of a subtropical ridge. Early on February 21, Crising made the third landfall over Balabac, Palawan and emerged into the South China Sea. The system encountered higher wind shear and dry air as the northeast monsoon was taking toll over the South China Sea. The circulation center became ill-definied and completely exposed. As such, the JTWC issued the final warning on the system on February 21. The PAGASA also issued the final warning as the system left the Philippine Area of Responsibility (PAR). Despite the system remained disorganized, the JMA still upgraded it to a tropical storm at 18:00 UTC, and assigned the name Shanshan, (Note: The name Shanshan (Cantonese: 珊珊, [saːn˥ saːn˥]) was contributed by Hong Kong and is a feminine given nickname meaning "sparkling" in Cantonese.) at about 320 km (200 mi) northeast of the Natuna Islands. Shanshan turned southwestward as steered by the northeast monsoon. However, Shanshan only remained as a tropical storm for 18 hours, before weakened back to a tropical depression. Shanshan dissipated early on February 23 just east of the Natuna Islands.

== Preparations and impact ==
Shortly after being classified as tropical depression, the PAGASA issued the PSWS #1 for four provinces in the Davao Region. The PSWS #1 later extended to southern part of Surigao del Sur, Agusan del Sur, provinces in Northern Mindanao, Bangsamoro, Soccsksargen, and Zamboanga Peninsula. On February 19, as Shanshan continued to move westward, the PSWS #1 further extended to the Sulu Archipelago and southern Palawan. The PSWS were progressively cancelled as Shanshan began to move away from the Philippines, and all PSWS were canecelled after Shanshan exited the PAR.

Shanshan brought rainfalls to Mindanao, while some areas were still recovering from Bopha which hit the island two months ago. In Baganga, floodwaters were chest-deep. 100 families were evacuated. Dipolog experienced minor flooding, but the rest of the Zamboanga Peninsula didn't felt much impacts. In Jose Abad Santos, Davao Occidental, Shanshan brought minor showers, though no one was injured in the city. Pre-school classes were suspended in Davao City on February 19, as PSWS #1 were issued. Schools in Cebu City, Lapu-Lapu City, and Talisay were closed on February 20 due to Shanshan, but no flooding and landslides reported in the province. Heavy rains triggered flooding and landslides in Mindanao and Eastern Visayas, four people were killed and two were missing. According to the National Disaster Risk Reduction and Management Council (NDRRMC), a total of 360,577 people were affected, 85% of the affected population were evacuated to temporary shelters. Shanshan killed 11 people across the Philippines, most of them were in the Davao Region. The storm injured four people and left two others missing. 1.346 houses were damaged, in which 447 of them were destroyed. Agricultural damage across the country was Php11.2 million (US$275 thousand).

As Shanshan weakened off the coast of Malaysia, the country felt waves of up to 1.4 m (4.6 ft) from the storm.

== See also ==
- Other tropical cyclones named Shanshan
- Other tropical cyclones named Crising
- List of near-Equatorial tropical cyclones
- Tropical Depression Greg (1996)
- Tropical Storm Sonamu (2013)
- Tropical Storm Jangmi (2014)
