= Typhoon Alice (1953) =

Pacific typhoon in 1953

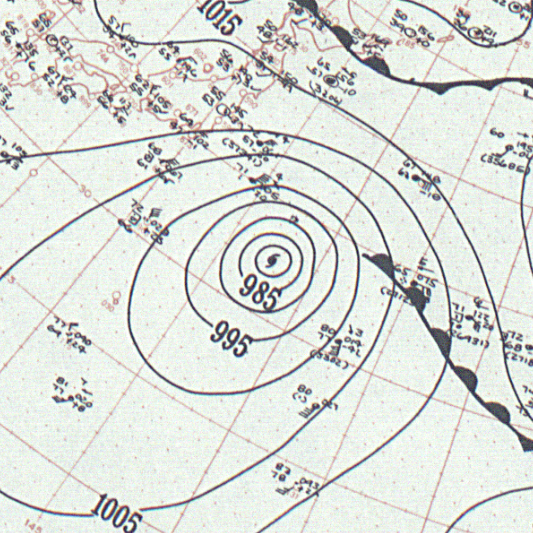
- Surface analysis of Typhoon Alice on October 19

Meteorological history
- Formed: October 11, 1953
- Dissipated: October 23, 1953

Typhoon
- 10-minute sustained (JMA)
- Lowest pressure: 915 hPa (mbar); 27.02 inHg

Category 3-equivalent typhoon
- 1-minute sustained (SSHWS/JTWC)
- Highest winds: 185 km/h (115 mph)

Overall effects
- Fatalities: 3 direct, 1 indirect
- Damage: >$100,000 (1953 USD)
- Areas affected: Guam, Iwo Jima
- IBTrACS
- Part of the 1953 Pacific typhoon season

Typhoon Alice was a typhoon that brought severe flooding to Guam during the latter part of the 1953 Pacific typhoon season. The system was first tracked near the Marshall Islands on October 11 by the Fleet Weather Central (FWC) as a tropical storm, and the Central Meteorological Observatory (CMO) as a tropical depression. The CMO upgraded Alice to a tropical storm east of Guam on October 14. One day later, and the FWC reported that the storm had intensified to 65 knots (75 mph; 120 km/h), equivalent to a Category 1 typhoon on the Saffir–Simpson scale. Near Iwo Jima, the typhoon traveled northeastwards, reaching its peak of 100 kn (115 mph; 185 km/h) late on October 18. Alice then steadily weakened down to a tropical storm on October 20. The storm became extratropical on October 23 near the International Date Line, and both agencies ceased tracking the cyclone.

As the typhoon moved near Guam from October 14 to October 16, 18.33 inches (46.6 cm) of rain fell within 24 hours, at the time a record for the territory. Villages on the island had homes and businesses flooded, causing thousands of dollars of damage. Several bridges were washed away, causing of three of the deaths. Andersen Air Force Base suffered from flooding, but military installations were not heavily damaged. Damage totals on the island exceed $100,000 (1953 USD). Little damage was reported in Iwo Jima, where Alice moved to the east of the island.

== Meteorological history ==
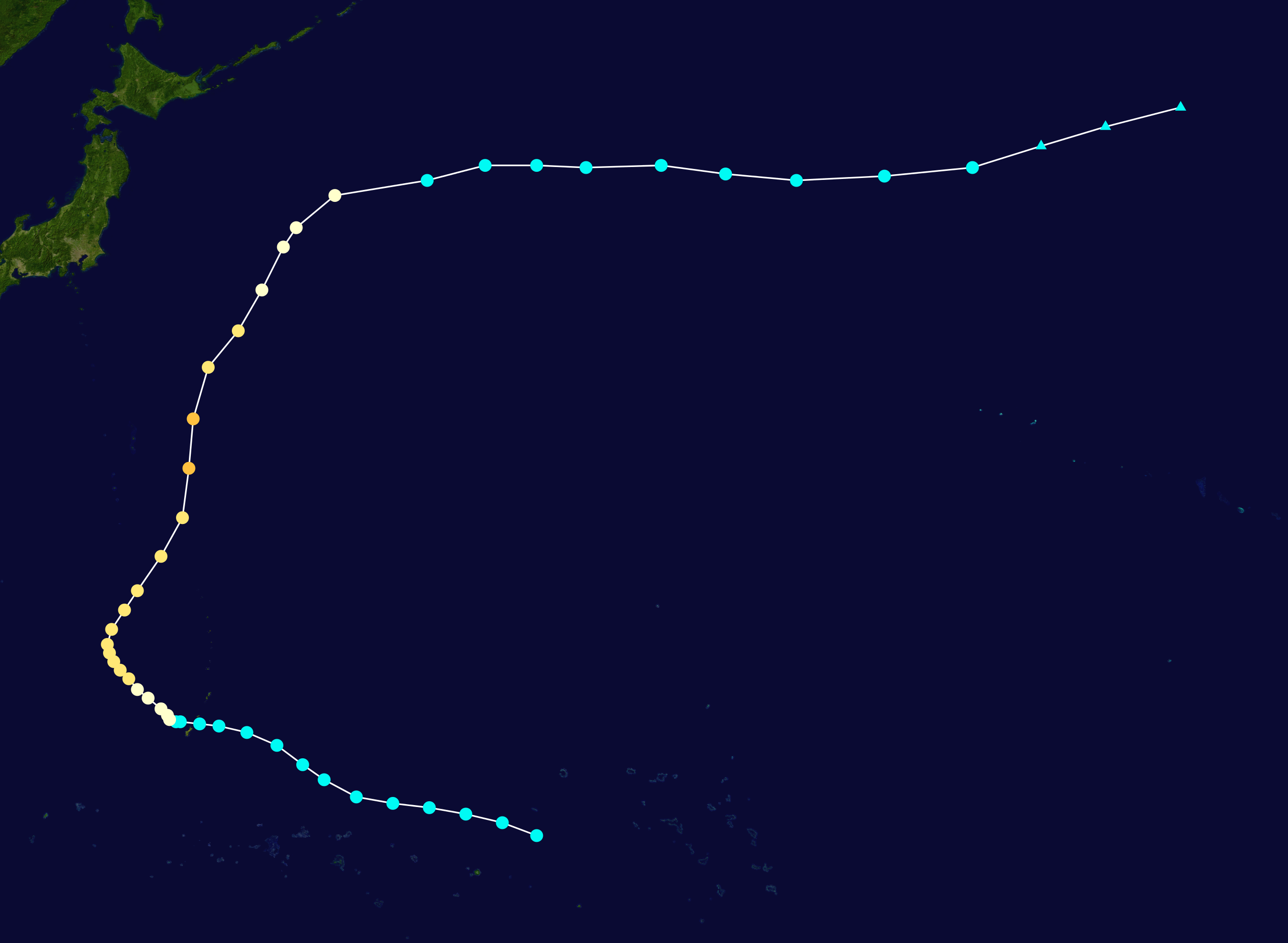
Map plotting the storm's track and intensity, according to the Saffir–Simpson scale Map key Saffir–Simpson scale Tropical depression (≤38 mph, ≤62 km/h) Tropical storm (39–73 mph, 63–118 km/h) Category 1 (74–95 mph, 119–153 km/h) Category 2 (96–110 mph, 154–177 km/h) Category 3 (111–129 mph, 178–208 km/h) Category 4 (130–156 mph, 209–251 km/h) Category 5 (≥157 mph, ≥252 km/h) Unknown Storm type Tropical cyclone Subtropical cyclone Extratropical cyclone, remnant low, tropical disturbance, or monsoon depression

The Fleet Weather Central (FWC) and the Central Meteorological Observatory (CMO) began tracking a system west of the Marshall Islands at 12:00 UTC on October 11. (Note: The Japan Meteorological Agency is the official Regional Specialized Meteorological Center for the western Pacific Ocean.) (Note: The Fleet Weather Central and the Central Meteorological Observatory were predecessors of the Joint Typhoon Warning Center and the Japan Meteorological Agency respectively.) The FWC tracked the system as a tropical storm with winds of 35 knots (40 mph; 65 km/h), and the CMO as a tropical depression with a pressure reading of 1,006 hectopascals (29.7 inHg). The system strengthened slowly as it moved west-northwestward, with the CMO reporting Alice had strengthened to a tropical storm near Guam at 00:00 UTC on October 14, with a barometric pressure of 1,000 hPa (30 inHg). At that time, the FWC had reported winds of 45 kn (50 mph; 85 km/h). Alice began to slow down near Guam, strengthening to 75 kn (85 mph; 140 km/h) at 00:00 UTC one day later, equivalent to a Category 1 typhoon on the Saffir–Simpson scale. After October 15, Alice began to travel northwestwards and continued to intensify. At 06:00 UTC on October 16, the typhoon had strengthened to 85 kn (100 mph; 155 km/h), with a pressure reading of 979 hPa (28.9 inHg). On October 17, the storm turned northeastward, with the FWC reporting winds of 90 kn (105 mph; 165 km/h). At 18:00 UTC, the CMO reported Alice's lowest barometric pressure at 915 hPa (27.0 inHg).

The highest maximum sustained winds, 100 kn (115 mph; 185 km/h), equivalent to a Category 3 typhoon on the Saffir–Simpson scale, were recorded at 18:00 UTC on October 19 near Iwo Jima by the 56th Weather Reconnaissance Squadron. CMO had recorded a pressure of 920 hPa (27 inHg) at that time. According to an analysis of the historic western north Pacific tropical cyclone record in the Monthly Weather Review, it was likely that stronger winds existed near the eye, but were not observed. Alice began to steadily weaken later that day to 75 kn (85 mph; 140 km/h) by October 20. At 18:00 UTC, the system had weakened below typhoon strength to a tropical storm with sustained winds of 60 kn (70 mph; 110 km/h), as it turned east and accelerated away from Japan. Alice traveled near the International Date Line (IDL) and had weakened to 35 kn (40 mph; 65 km/h) at 18:00 UTC of October 22 according to the FWC. The CMO declared the storm to be extratropical six hours later, as it traveled past the IDL. The cyclone began to restrengthen up to 60 kn (69 mph; 110 km/h) by 12:00 UTC of October 23, when the FWC ceased tracking.

== Preparations and impact ==
The storm was not expected to strengthen near Guam, and personnel at the Andersen Air Force Base were told to remain in shelter. Reconnaissance flights were not able to take flight from the air force base, and flights were completed from Tokyo instead. Shipping, including reefer ships, to Guam were delayed.

Alice moved slowly to the north of Guam from October 14 to October 16, only moving 270 miles (430 km) during that time, causing significant flooding. During a 48-hour period, Andersen Air Force Base and Naval Air Station Agana received 32.51 and 21.21 in (826 and 539 mm) of rain respectively. The 24-hour rainfall total at Andersen Air Base, 18.33 in (466 mm), was the record high in Guam until Typhoon Pamela of 1976 struck the island. A peak wind gust of 56 kn (64 mph; 104 km/h) and a minimum atmospheric pressure of 1,001 mbar (29.6 inHg) were also recorded on the island. The resulting floods washed away four bridges across the island, cutting off access to the villages of Talofofo, Inarajan, Merizo, and Umatac. Floodwaters at Tamuning reached 3 to 4 feet (0.91 to 1.22 m) high. Electricity was shut off in areas with flooding issues, and a boil-water advisory was in effect. Multiple roads, including Highways 4 and 8, were rendered impassable, and Marine Drive had debris floating and stalled cars alongside it.

Many homes and businesses across the island were damaged by the floods. Thousands of dollars of merchandise and properties were ruined, causing stores to close down for repairs. Government offices were also closed or on stand-by except public works and the police departments. Access to the Navy commissary was blocked by waters that were up to 5 to 7 feet (1.5 to 2.1 m) high. Water leaked into the Guam Memorial Hospital, prompting doctors and nurses to move patients and supplies to dryer areas. Residents in Yigo, Tamuning, and Asan had floodwaters damage their homes, causing some to evacuate. Much of Andersen Air Force Base was flooded, and two airmen were electrocuted when they were leaning against a metal doorknob at The Airman's Club. Naval installations at the base had minor water damage, and operations returned to normal one day later. Four deaths were reported during the storm. Two of them were airmen attempting to cross the Talofofo River when the bridge washed away. A search party was initiated, but it was later called off as no bodies were found. One of the bodies was found near Dealy Beach and Togcha on October 19. The third casualty was a Filipino firefighter who had also attempted to cross the river, with his body found 500 yards (460 m) from the bridge. The fourth death was a farmer dying from a heart attack in his pasture during the storm; he had been previously reported as drowned. Property damage totals exceeded $100,000 (equivalent to $1,175,249 in 2024). Ford Quint Elvidge, the Governor of Guam, toured the island and inspected the damage, praising the government agencies for their efforts.

As Alice passed 100 mi (160 km) east of Iwo Jima on October 19, light rainfall of 1.5 in (38 mm) and winds of 70 mph (110 km/h) were reported on the island.

== See also ==
- Other storms of the same name
- Typhoon Hester (1952)
