= Tropical Depression Crising (2017) =

Pacific tropical depression in 2017

Tropical Depression 02W (Crising)
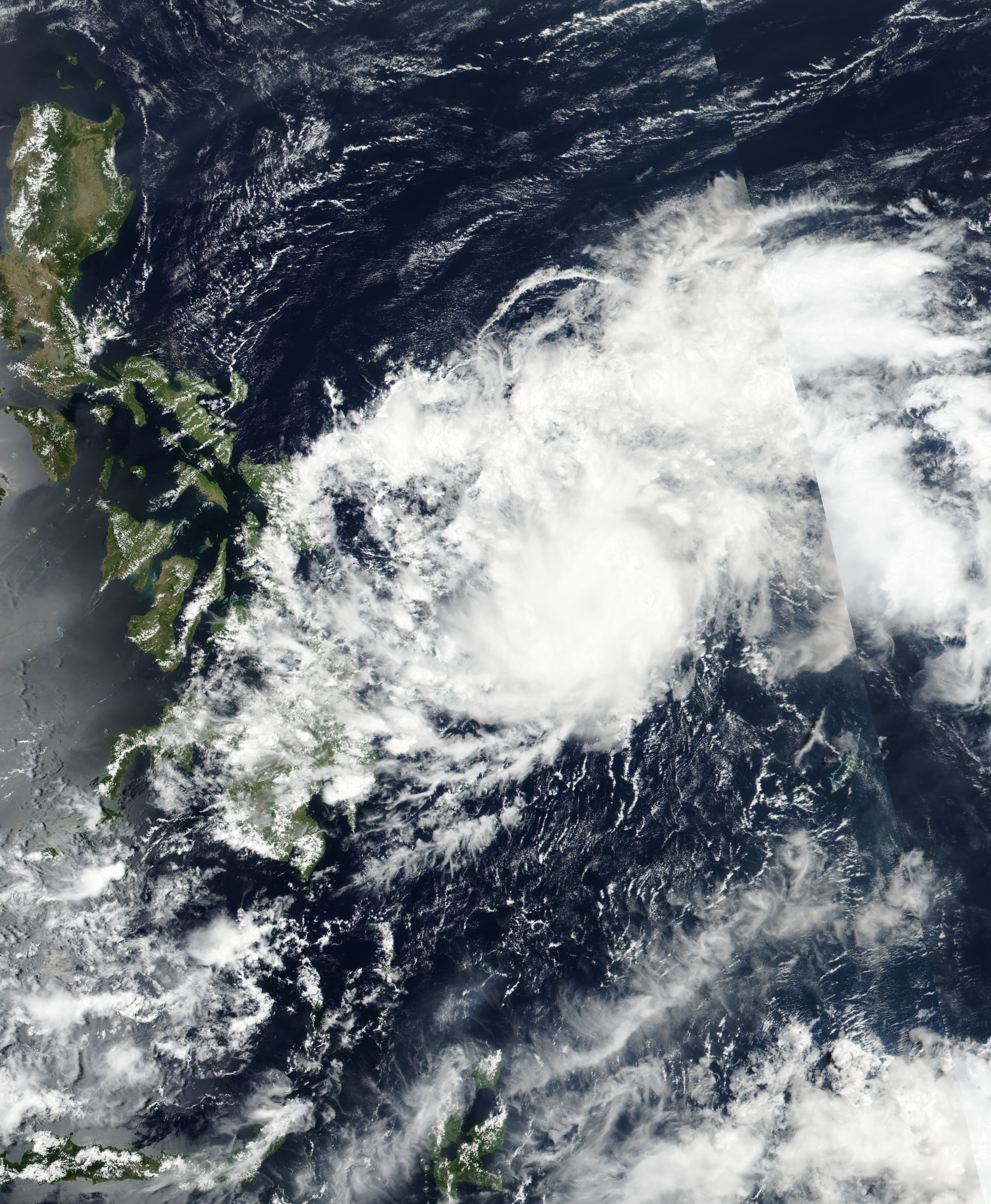
- Tropical Depression Crising approaching the Philippines on April 14

Meteorological history
- Formed: April 13, 2017
- Post-tropical: April 19, 2017
- Dissipated: April 20, 2017

Tropical depression
- 10-minute sustained (JMA)
- Highest winds: 55 km/h (35 mph)
- Lowest pressure: 1006 hPa (mbar); 29.71 inHg

Tropical depression
- 1-minute sustained (SSHWS/JTWC)
- Highest winds: 45 km/h (30 mph)
- Lowest pressure: 1004 hPa (mbar); 29.65 inHg

Overall effects
- Fatalities: 10 total
- Damage: $1.7 million (2017 USD)
- Areas affected: Palau, Philippines, Taiwan
- IBTrACS /
- Part of the 2017 Pacific typhoon season

Tropical Depression Crising was a weak tropical cyclone which produced flooding and landslides in the central Philippines in mid-April 2017. Crising formed as a tropical depression on April 13 near Palau. The system moved west-northwest and struck Samar on April 15. It then crossed the Visayas and emerged into the South China Sea on the next day. Crising turned north-northeast on April 17. Due to dry air and wind shear, Crising could only intensify slightly. Environmental condition soon deteriorated, and Crising weakened to a low-pressure on April 19. The remnants continued to track northeastward and dissipated on the next day southeast of Taiwan.

Despite being weak while crossing the Philippines, Crising still brought heavy rains to the region, which triggered flooding and landslides. Flights and water transports were cancelled, which led to thousands of people being stranded. Cebu was the hardest-hit province, and most of the fatalities occurred in that province. Ten cities or towns in Cebu were inundated. There were reports about observing a tornado in the province, but the authority was unable to verify. Across the country, ten people were killed by Crising, and the damage was amounted to $1.7 million (2017 USD).

== Meteorological history ==
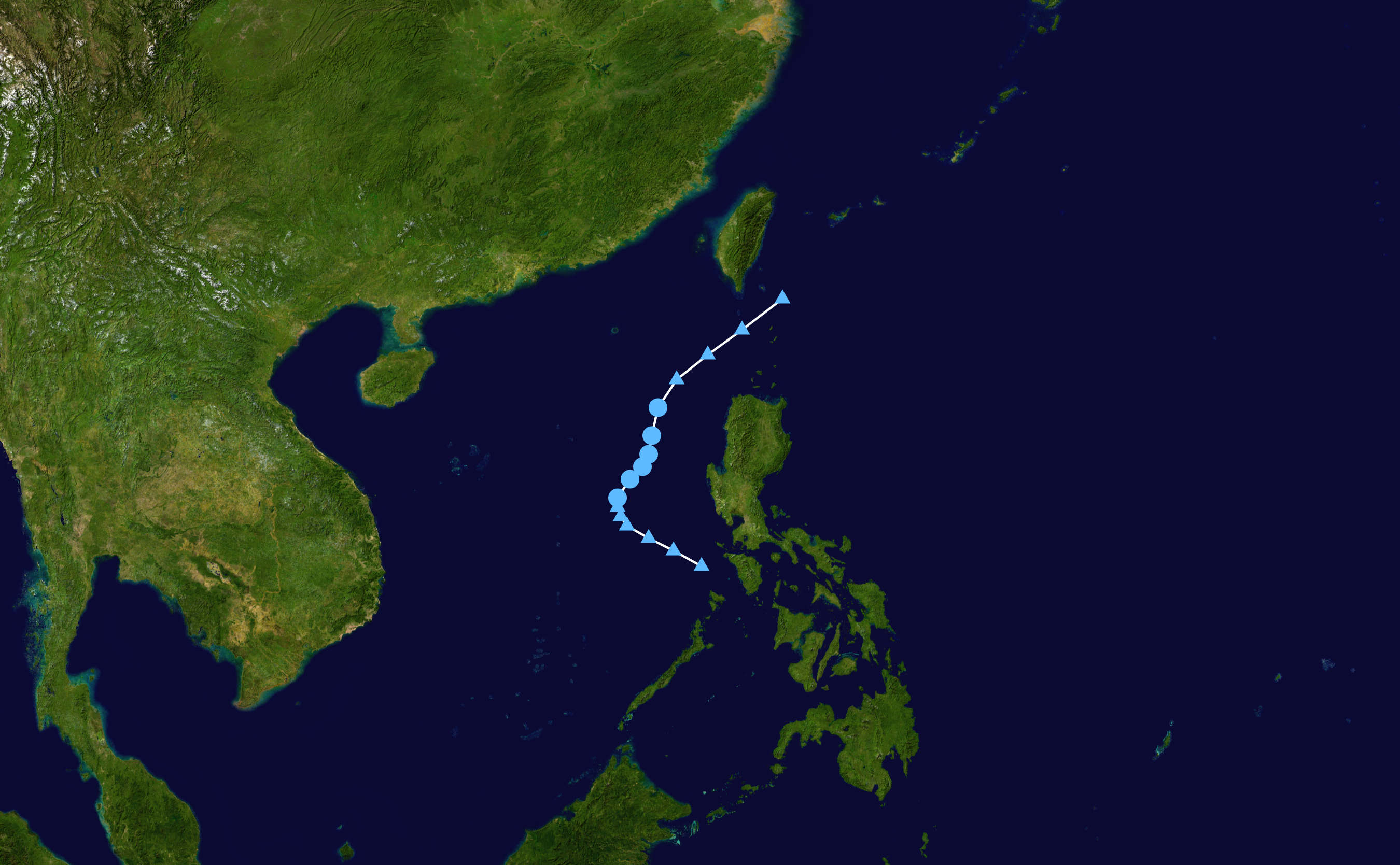
Map plotting the storm's track and intensity, according to the Saffir–Simpson scale Map key Saffir–Simpson scale Tropical depression (≤38 mph, ≤62 km/h) Tropical storm (39–73 mph, 63–118 km/h) Category 1 (74–95 mph, 119–153 km/h) Category 2 (96–110 mph, 154–177 km/h) Category 3 (111–129 mph, 178–208 km/h) Category 4 (130–156 mph, 209–251 km/h) Category 5 (≥157 mph, ≥252 km/h) Unknown Storm type Tropical cyclone Subtropical cyclone Extratropical cyclone, remnant low, tropical disturbance, or monsoon depression

Early on April 13, the Japan Meteorological Agency (JMA) noted that a tropical depression formed near Palau. Convection wrapped into a well-defined center, which prompted the Joint Typhoon Warning Center (JTWC) issued a Tropical Cyclone Formation Alert (TCFA) to the system later that day. Despite favourable condition including good poleward outflow and low wind shear, proximity to land hindered significant development. On the next day, the JTWC upgraded the system to a tropical depression and designated as 02W. Meanwhile, the Philippine Atmospheric, Geophysical, and Astronomical Services Administration (PAGASA) began tracking the system, and assigned the local name Crising. It tracked west-northwest as steered by a low-to mid-level ridge and approached the eastern Philippines. At 18:30 PST (10:30 UTC) April 15, Crising made landfall in Hernani, Eastern Samar. The PAGASA downgraded it to a low-pressure area hours after landfall, and the JTWC issued its final warning on the system. However, in post-season analysis, the JTWC revealed that Crising was still a low-pressure area at that time.

The remnants of Crising emerged into the South China Sea on the next day. On April 17, deep convection burst over the center, but soon weakened due to wind shear and dry air from a low-level trough. The system began to curve north-northeast due to the trough. The PAGASA stop monitoring the system on that day, as it no longer brought any direct impacts on the country. Early on April 18, the JTWC upgraded the system to a tropical depression again, as the center became well-defined and deep convection burst over the eastern part of it. Despite the continuous effect of wind shear, good poleward outflow offset it and allowed Crising to re-develop. Nonetheless, the re-development of Crising was short-lived, as wind shear soon increased. Despite some convection burst over the eastern part on April 19, the center was elongated and was completely exposed. The JTWC downgraded it to a low-pressure area later that day. The remnants continued to track northeastward, and crossed the Luzon Strait. It dissipated on the next day southeast of Taiwan.

== Preparations and impact ==
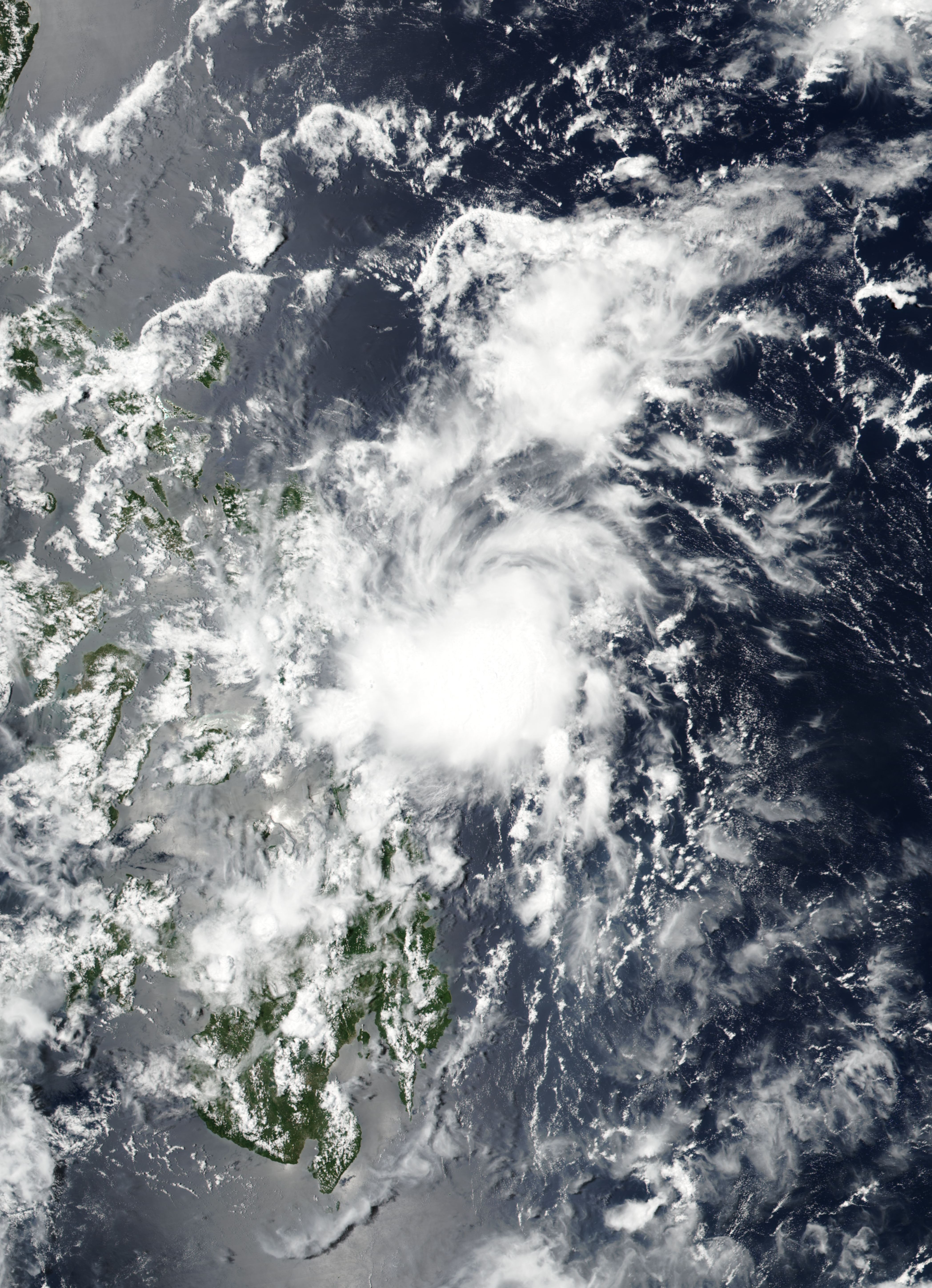
Tropical Depression Crising shortly before landfall in Samar on April 15

Shortly after attaining tropical depression status on April 14, the PAGASA issued the TCWS #1 for Samar and northern part of Leyte. The TCWS #1 extended to Biliran, Sorsogon, Albay, Catanduanes, and Masbate including the Ticao Island and the Burias Island later that day as Crising approached. On April 15, the TCWS #1 further extend to Romblon, Panay, northern Cebu and northern Negros Occidental. All TCWS were lifted after Crising weakened to a low-pressure area.

Tourists in the Visayas and southern Luzon were urged to leave early or cancel their trips as Crising was expected to bring heavy rains that could trigger flooding and landslides. Water transports could be disrupted and affected their journey. Also, people on the beach should be caution about high waves. Water transports were cancelled due to high waves. 4,525 people were stranded across the Philippines. Two domestic flights from the Cebu Pacific was cancelled due to bad weather. Heavy rains from Crising lashed Cebu. Rainfall in Cebu City reached 82.3 mm (3.24 in), almost the double of the average rainfall in April. Three mudslides were reported in the city, while minor landslides were reported in Talisay and Sogod. The rains caused flooding and killed nine people in the province. Most of the fatalities were from Carmen, as the town was affected by 1.8 m (6 ft) of floodwaters. 300 people were forced to evacuate. Ten cities or towns in Cebu were flooded. 19 people were injured across the province. 839 houses were damaged, in which 56 of them were destroyed. Local citizens reported that a tornado hit the province, but the PAGASA was unable to verify that. The province reported a loss of ₱84.8 million (US$1.7 million). Another person in Burauen, Leyte died because of electrocution. In all, 8,916 people were affected by Crising.

== Aftermath ==
On April 17, the government of Carmen declared a state of calamity, as the town suffered widespread damage with lots of fatalities from the flooding. A member of the Cebu Provincial Board urged the government to investigate the reason of the massive deaths in Carmen, while a preliminary report stated that the new building next to the river could be a reason. As all the PSWS were cancelled after Crising weakened to a low-pressure area, no precautionary evacuation were performed. People criticized that the downgrade of Crising to a low-pressure area was probably scientifically correct, but this weakened the alert of the citizens and they didn't take adequate precautions for Crising. This may be another reason of having massive fatalities in Cebu.

200 families displaced by the flooding were given 10 tents as their shelters. People who were affected by the flooding received food packages. The government of Carmen allocated a disaster relief of ₱6 million (US$121,000), and the families of the deaths received ₱10,000 for burial charge and relief goods. The Department of Social Welfare and Development (DSWD) allocated ₱1.04 billion (US$21 million) and 351,779 food packs for those who were affected by Crising.

== See also ==
- Weather of 2017
- Tropical cyclones in 2017
- Tropical Storm Higos (2008)
- Tropical Storm Tokage (2016)
- Tropical Storm Choi-wan (2021)
- Tropical Storm Megi (2022)
