= List of storms named Jongdari =

List of storms with the same or similar names

The name Jongdari (Korean: 종다리, [t͡ɕoŋdaɾi]) has been used to name two tropical cyclones in the western North Pacific Ocean. The name was contributed by North Korea and refers to the Eurasian skylark (Alauda arvensis) in Korean. It replaced the name Sonamu, which was retired following the 2013 Pacific typhoon season.

- Typhoon Jongdari (2018) (T1812, 15W) – strong, long-lived, and erratic tropical cyclone that impacted Japan and East China
- Tropical Storm Jongdari (2024) (T2409, 10W, Dindo) – affected Ryukyu Islands and the Korean Peninsula.

Preceded by Wukong	Pacific typhoon season names Jongdari	Succeeded by Shanshan
