= 2009 Pacific typhoon season =

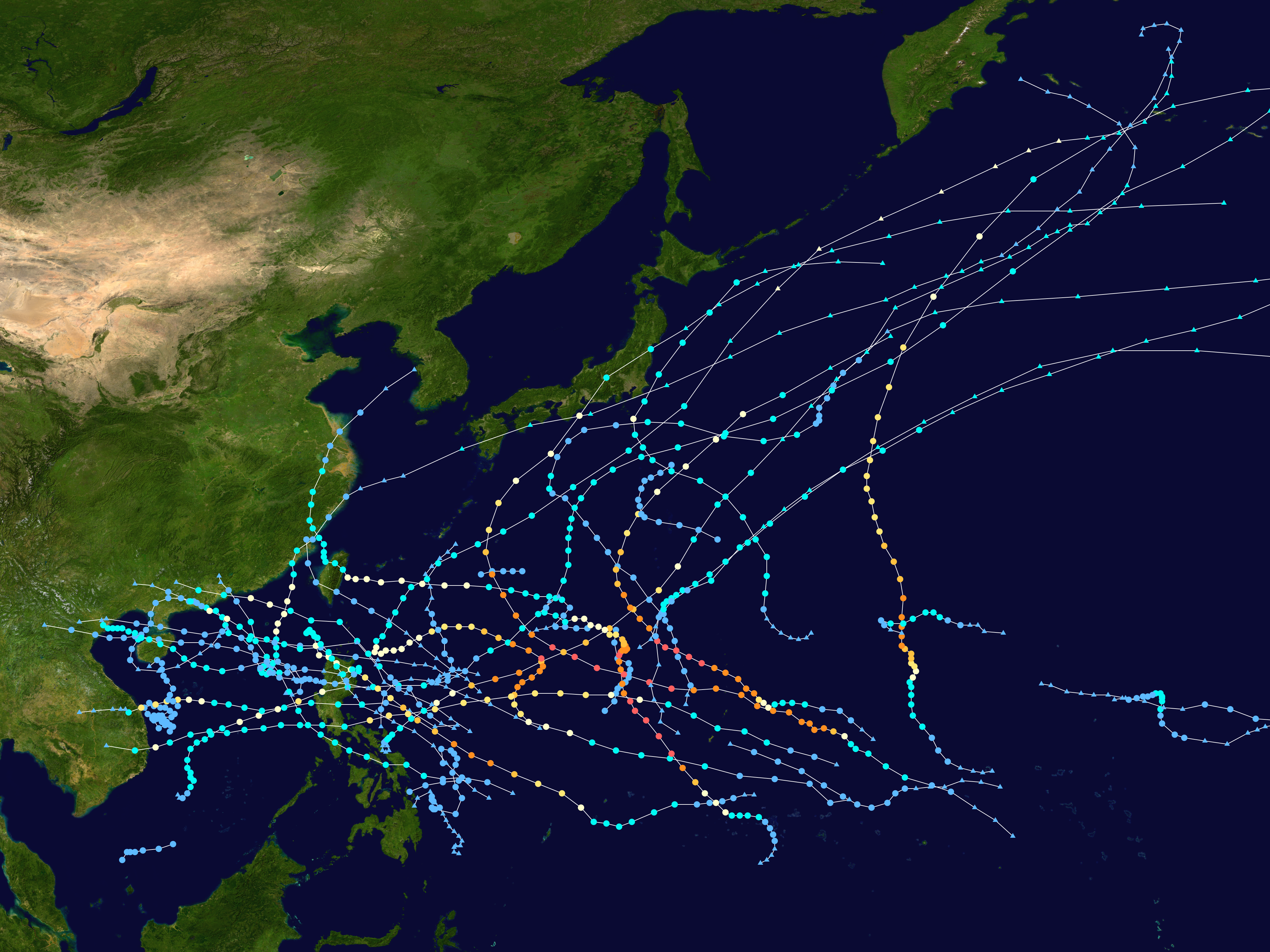
- Season summary map

Seasonal boundaries
- First system formed: January 3, 2009
- Last system dissipated: December 8, 2009

Strongest storm
- Name: Nida
  - Maximum winds: 215 km/h (130 mph) (10-minute sustained)
  - Lowest pressure: 905 hPa (mbar)

Seasonal statistics
- Total depressions: 41
- Total storms: 22
- Typhoons: 13
- Very strong typhoons: 7
- Violent typhoons: 3
- Total fatalities: 2,572 total
- Total damage: $11.85 billion (2009 USD)

Related articles
- Effects of the 2009 Pacific typhoon season in the Philippines; Timeline of the 2009 Pacific typhoon season; 2009 Atlantic hurricane season; 2009 Pacific hurricane season; 2009 North Indian Ocean cyclone season

The 2009 Pacific typhoon season was a below average season that spawned only 22 named storms, 13 typhoons, and five super typhoons. Despite this, it was a very deadly season, with the Philippines having experienced its deadliest season in decades due to the impact of typhoons Ketsana and Parma, while typhoon Morakot went on to become the deadliest storm to impact Taiwan in its modern history. The first half of the season was very quiet, whereas the second half of the season was extremely active. During August, Typhoon Morakot devastated Taiwan, killing nearly 800 people and being known for being the deadliest typhoon to impact the country. Typhoons Ketsana and Parma both affected the Philippines, bringing extreme flooding that killed more than 1400 people in total. Typhoon Nida during late November reached 1-minute winds of 285 km/h (175 mph), which is the most intense in the basin since Typhoon Paka in 1997. The season ran throughout 2009, though most tropical cyclone tend to develop between May and November. The season's first named storm, Kujira, developed on May 3, while the season's last named storm, Nida, dissipated on December 3.

The scope of this article is limited to the Pacific Ocean to the north of the equator between 100°E and 180th meridian. Within the northwestern Pacific Ocean, there are two agencies which assign names to tropical cyclones which can often result in a cyclone having two names. The Japan Meteorological Agency (JMA) (Note: The Japan Meteorological Agency is the official Regional Specialized Meteorological Center for the western Pacific Ocean.) will name a tropical cyclone if it has 10-minute sustained wind speeds of at least 65 km/h (40 mph) anywhere in the basin, while the Philippine Atmospheric, Geophysical and Astronomical Services Administration (PAGASA) assigns names to tropical cyclones which are active in the Philippine Area of Responsibility (PAR), located between 135°E and 115°E and between 5°N–25°N, regardless of whether or not a tropical cyclone has already been given a name by the JMA. Tropical depressions that are monitored by the United States' Joint Typhoon Warning Center (JTWC) (Note: The Joint Typhoon Warning Center is a joint United States Navy – United States Air Force task force that issues tropical cyclone warnings for the western Pacific Ocean and other regions.) (Note: A super typhoon is an unofficial category used by the Joint Typhoon Warning Center (JTWC) for a typhoon with winds of at least 240 km/h (150 mph).) are given a number with a "W" suffix.

== Seasonal forecasts ==
TSR forecasts Date	Tropical storms	Total Typhoons	Intense TCs	ACE	Ref.
Average (1965–2008)	26.6	16.7	8.6	300	
March 16, 2009	25.6	16.0	6.7	247	
May 7, 2009	27.5	17.6	9.1	319	
July 6, 2009	28.0	18.1	10.3	359	
August 4, 2009	26.0	18.2	10.6	367	
Other forecasts Date	Forecast Center	Period		Systems	Ref.
January 4, 2009	PAGASA	January–December		<19 tropical cyclones	
March 18, 2009	HKO	January–December		5–6 tropical cyclones	
April 20, 2009	GCACIC	January–December		31 tropical cyclones	
June 18, 2009	GCACIC	January–December		30 tropical cyclones	
June 30, 2009	CWB	January–December		24–27 tropical cyclones	
May 1, 2009	VNCHMF	January–December		6> tropical cyclones	
2009 season	Forecast Center	Tropical cyclones	Tropical storms	Typhoons	Ref.
Actual activity:	JMA	39	22	13	
Actual activity:	JTWC	30	24	15	
Actual activity:	PAGASA	22	12	8	

During each season, several national meteorological services and scientific agencies forecast how many tropical cyclones, tropical storms, and typhoons will form during a season and/or how many tropical cyclones will affect a particular country. These agencies include the Tropical Storm Risk (TSR) Consortium of the University College London, Guy Carpenter Asia-Pacific Climate Impact Centre of the City University of Hong Kong (GCACIC) and Taiwan's Central Weather Bureau.

On January 4, PAGASA reported that they were expecting 19 or less tropical cyclones to affect the Philippines during 2009. During March, the TSR Consortium released their first forecast of the season and predicted that activity within the basin would be about 20% below normal with 25.6 tropical storms, 16 typhoons and 6.7 intense typhoons and an ACE index of around 247. Later that month the Hong Kong Observatory, predicted that the typhoon season in Hong Kong would be near normal with five to six tropical cyclones passing within 500 km (310 mi) of the territory compared to an average of 6. During April, the GCACIC issued its first seasonal forecast for the year and predicted that the season would see activity near its average with 31 tropical cyclones, 27 tropical storms, and 18 typhoons occurring during the season. The GCACIC also predicted that 4 tropical cyclones would make landfall on Southern China between April and August compared to an average of 3, they also predicted that no tropical cyclones would make landfall between August and December. (Note: According to the TSR, an intense tropical cyclone is a tropical cyclone with maximum 1-minute sustained winds greater than 175 km/h (110 mph).) On May 7, TSR increased its forecast to 27.5 tropical storms, 17.6 typhoons, 9.1 "intense" typhoons and an ACE index of about 311 units, after La Niña conditions weakened and confidence grew that La Niña conditions would not return during 2009. Later that month the Vietnamese National Center for Hydro Meteorological forecasts predicted that six or more tropical cyclones would affect Vietnam during 2009.

During June, the GCACIC reported that the total number of tropical cyclones had decreased from 31 to 30, and that the total number of typhoons had increased to 19, while there was no change to the number of tropical storms predicted to occur during the season. They also predicted that 3 tropical cyclones would make landfall on Southern China between July and December compared to an average of 4. On June 30, the Taiwan Central Weather Bureau predicted that the season would see activity near its average of 26.6, and predicted that between 24 – 27 tropical storms would occur over the Western Pacific. The Central Weather Bureau also predicted that of the 24-27 tropical storms forecast 3-5 of them would affect Taiwan. In their July and August forecasts TSR upped their prediction for the amount of intense typhoons by one to ten and eleven respectively, whilst predicting the same amount of tropical storms and typhoons. In July and August they also predicted that the season would now see activity about 20% above normal. After their initial prediction was surpassed by Tropical Depression Tino forming, PAGASA announced that they expecting two or three more cyclones to affect the Philippines, before the end of the year.

== Season summary ==
The season started with Tropical Depression Auring east of the Philippines, which was then followed by Tropical Depression Bising a month later. After 2 months of inactivity, Tropical Depression Crising and Typhoon Kujira forms, and Kujira becoming the first major typhoon of the season, and was followed by the development of Typhoon Chan-hom in the South China Sea, and hit Pangasinan and crossed the Philippines. In mid-June, Severe Tropical Storm Linfa and Tropical Storm Nangka form and hit the Philippines.

It was followed 1 month later by Tropical Storm Soudelor, which passed through the Batanes Strait and headed for China, and followed by Tropical Depression Huaning which hit Taiwan. Typhoon Molave and Tropical Storm Goni head for China, while Typhoon Morakot becomes the most-costliest storm in Taiwanese history. Tropical Storm Etau briefly forms, and followed by Tropical Depression Maka from the Central Pacific basin, while Typhoon Vamco develops into a Category 4 but barely affects any major landmass. Krovanh peaks as a severe tropical storm, while Dujuan heads northeastward, and not affecting any landmass. Tropical Storm Mujigae forms in the South China Sea, which is followed by Typhoon Koppu, which crossed Northern Luzon. Typhoon Ketsana drops record rainfall in the Philippines, and is followed by Typhoon Parma which drops more rainfall to the already saturated Philippines. Typhoon Melor becomes a Category 5 while Nepartak briefly forms as a tropical storm, and Lupit becomes another Category 5 and nearly hits the Philippines before heading northeast. Typhoon Mirinae hits Central Luzon, causing more damages and misery to the Philippines. Tropical Depression Tino and Urduja briefly form, and Typhoon Nida (Vinta) becomes the strongest and final named storm of the season, which is then followed by a weak tropical depression in late December 2009. Due to many typhoons hitting the Philippines, the 2009 Pacific typhoon season was the costliest season for the Philippines on record.

== Systems ==
=== Tropical Depression Auring ===
- Tropical depression (JMA)
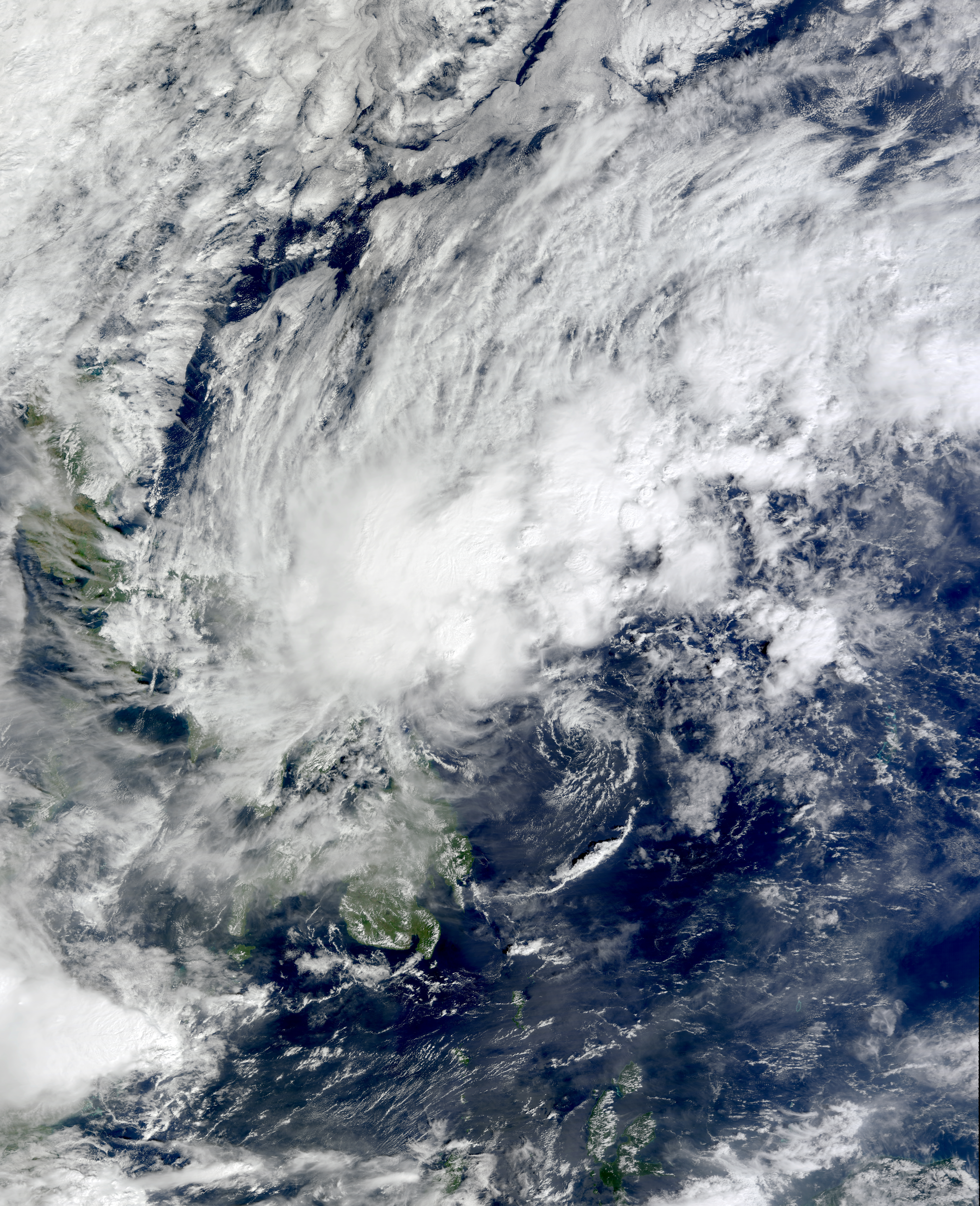
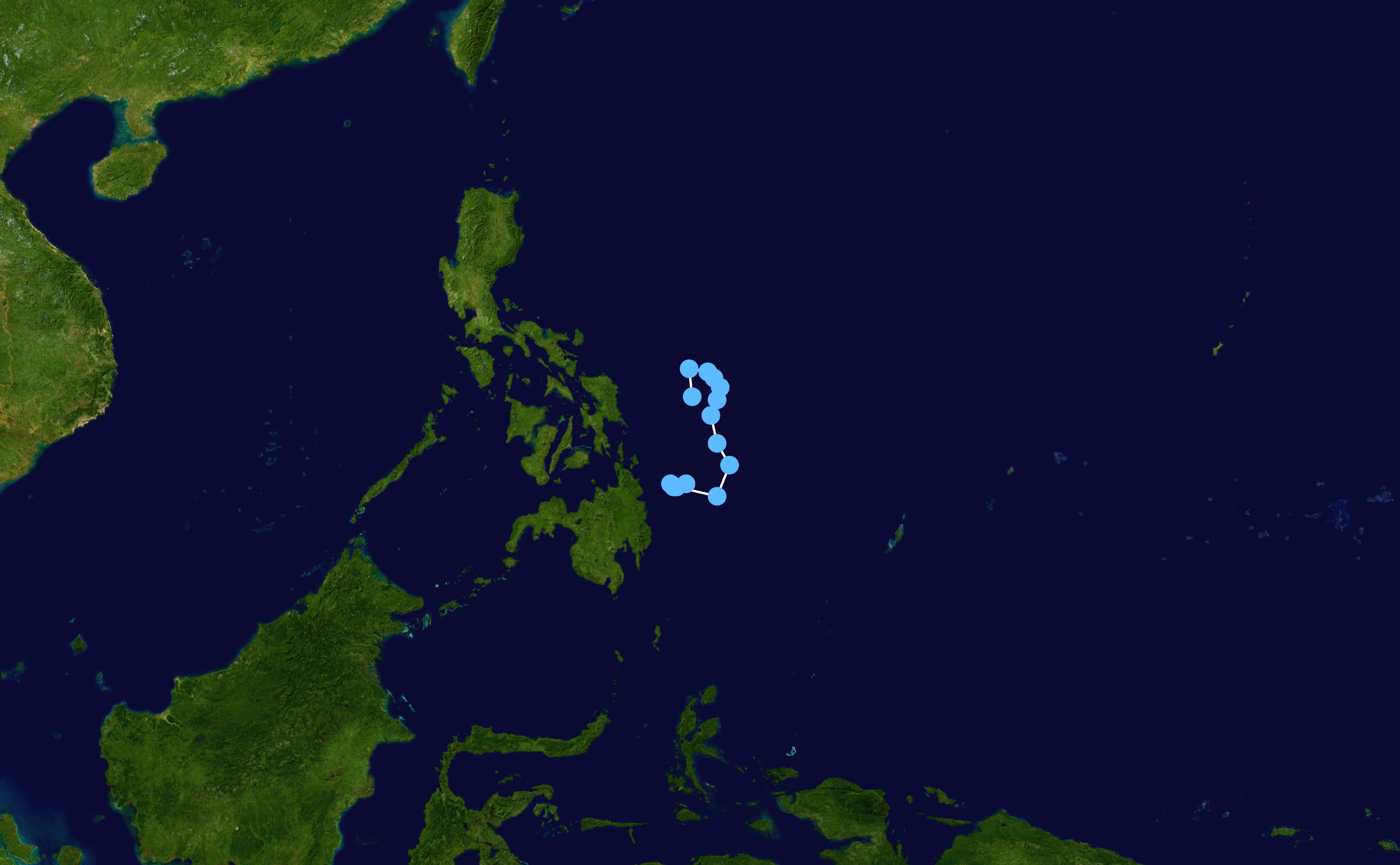
- Duration: January 3 – January 6
- Peak intensity: 45 km/h (30 mph) (10-min); 1006 hPa (mbar)

Tropical Depression Auring formed as a tropical disturbance late on December 30, 2008, to the southeast of Manila in the Philippines. Over the next few days the disturbance gradually developed before early on January 3, both PAGASA and the JMA, reported that the disturbance had intensified into the first tropical depression of the season with PAGASA assigning the name Auring to the depression. As the depression was moving into a high level of vertical wind shear, it did not develop any further and late on January 5 as the baroclinic zone approached Auring, it was downgraded to a low-pressure area by PAGASA before the JMA followed suit the next day as it was declared as dissipated by the JTWC.

Heavy rain from Auring produced severe flooding in the eastern Philippines. Two people were killed and nine others were left missing. A total of 305 homes were destroyed and another 610 were damaged. In addition, an estimated 53 hectares (130 acres) of rice and 3.5 hectares (8.6 acres) of corn were damaged. About 43,851 people were affected by the depression and damages were estimated at PHP 23 million (498,318 USD).

=== Tropical Depression Bising ===
- Tropical depression (PAGASA)
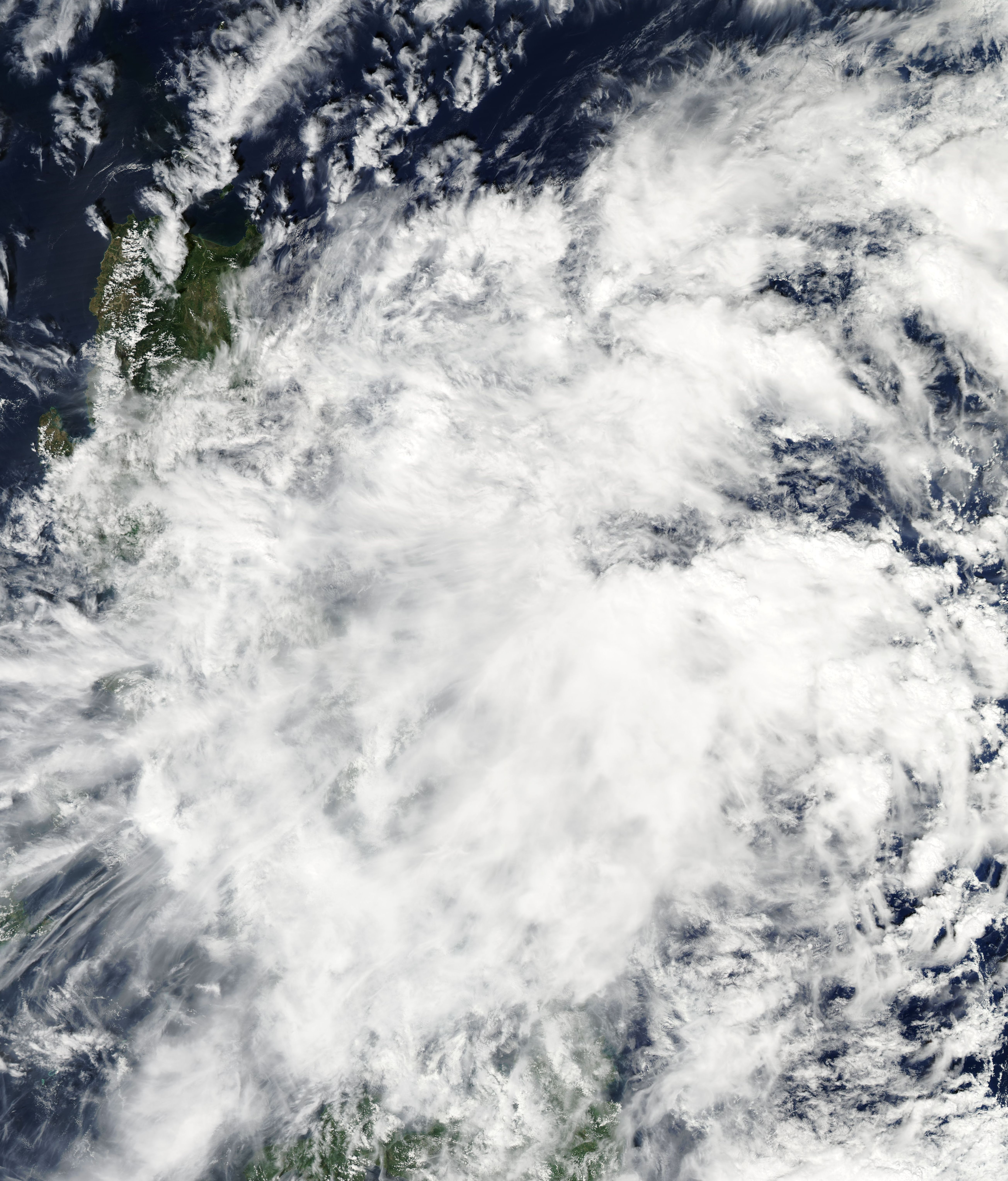
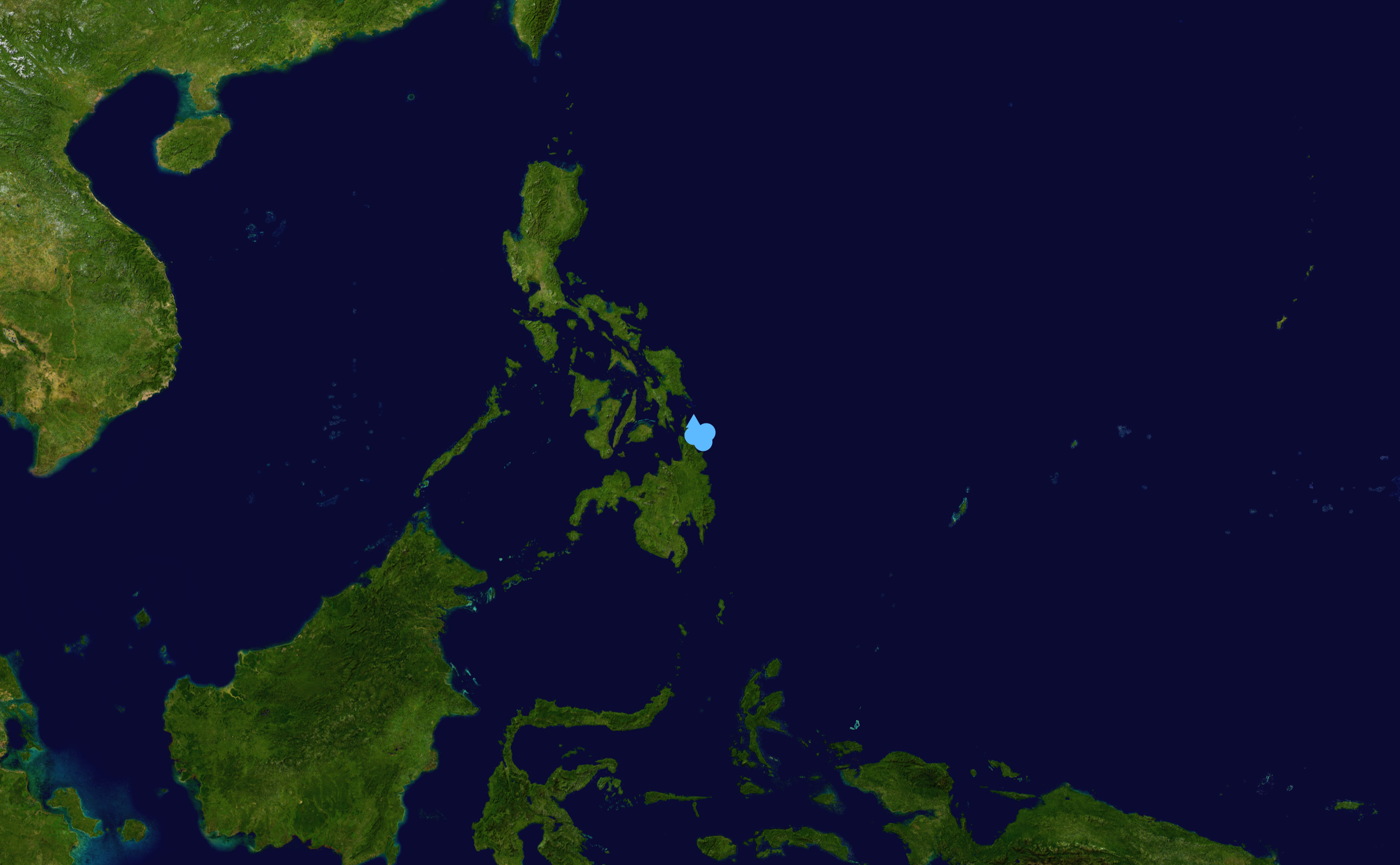
- Duration: February 12 – February 13
- Peak intensity: 45 km/h (30 mph) (10-min); 1002 hPa (mbar)

Early on February 12, PAGASA reported that a low-pressure area located about 140 km (87 mi) to the east of Surigao City in the Philippines had intensified into a tropical depression. During that day the depression gradually moved towards the west with its peak windspeeds estimated at 45 km/h (30 mph). Early the next morning after the depression had made landfall on Dinagat Island, PAGASA released its final advisory as the depression had weakened into an area of low pressure.

An estimated 473 passengers and several vehicles were stranded in Liloan and Ormoc due to ferry cancellations. In Cebu, an estimated 1,600 passengers were also stranded due to the depression. Late on February 13, the remnants of Bising brought scattered rainshowers across Southern Luzon, Bicol Region, and Visayas, then dissipated. The rainfall led to mudslides on Cebu Island which blocked the Cebu Transcentral Highway.

=== Tropical Depression Crising ===
- Tropical depression (PAGASA)
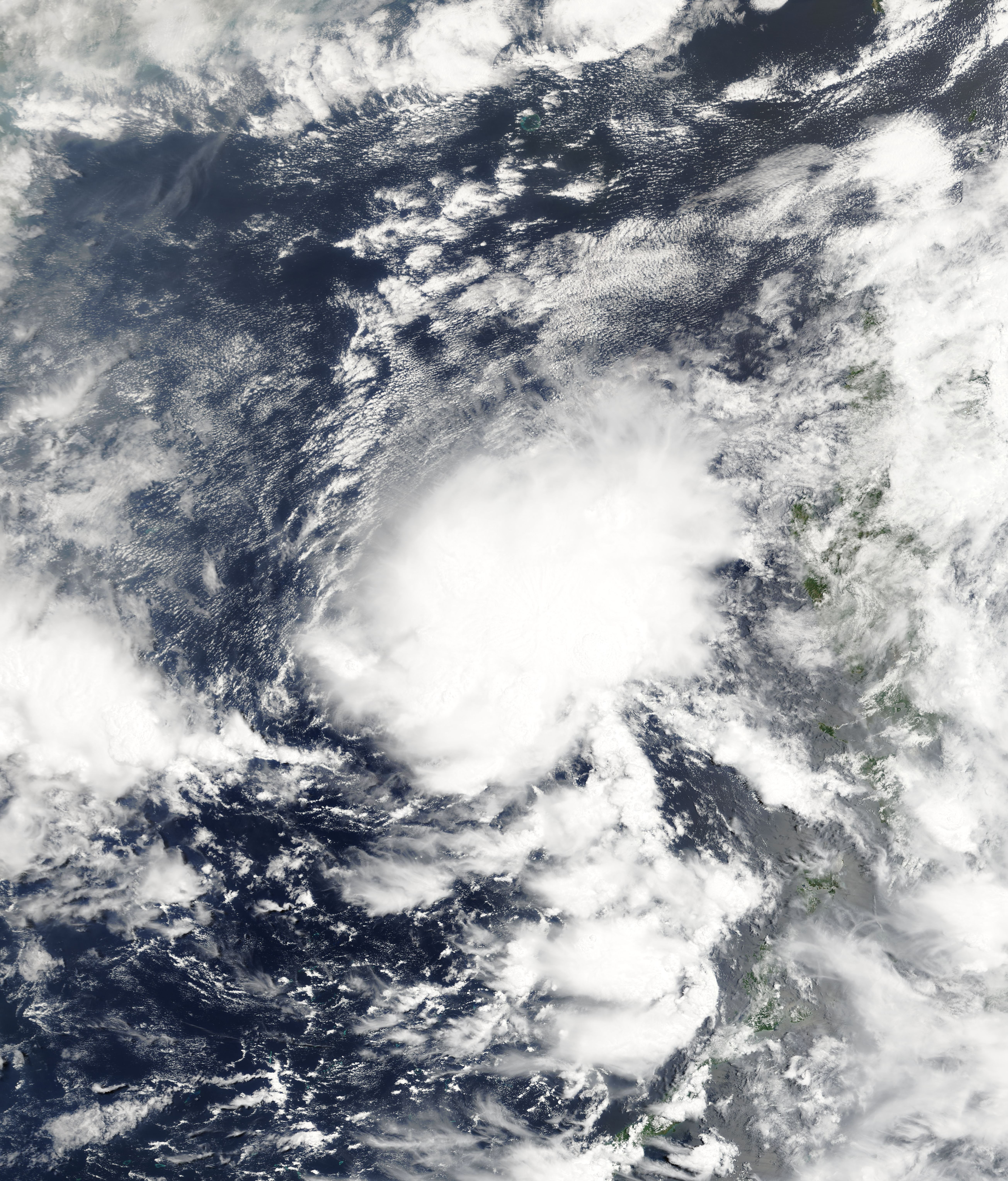
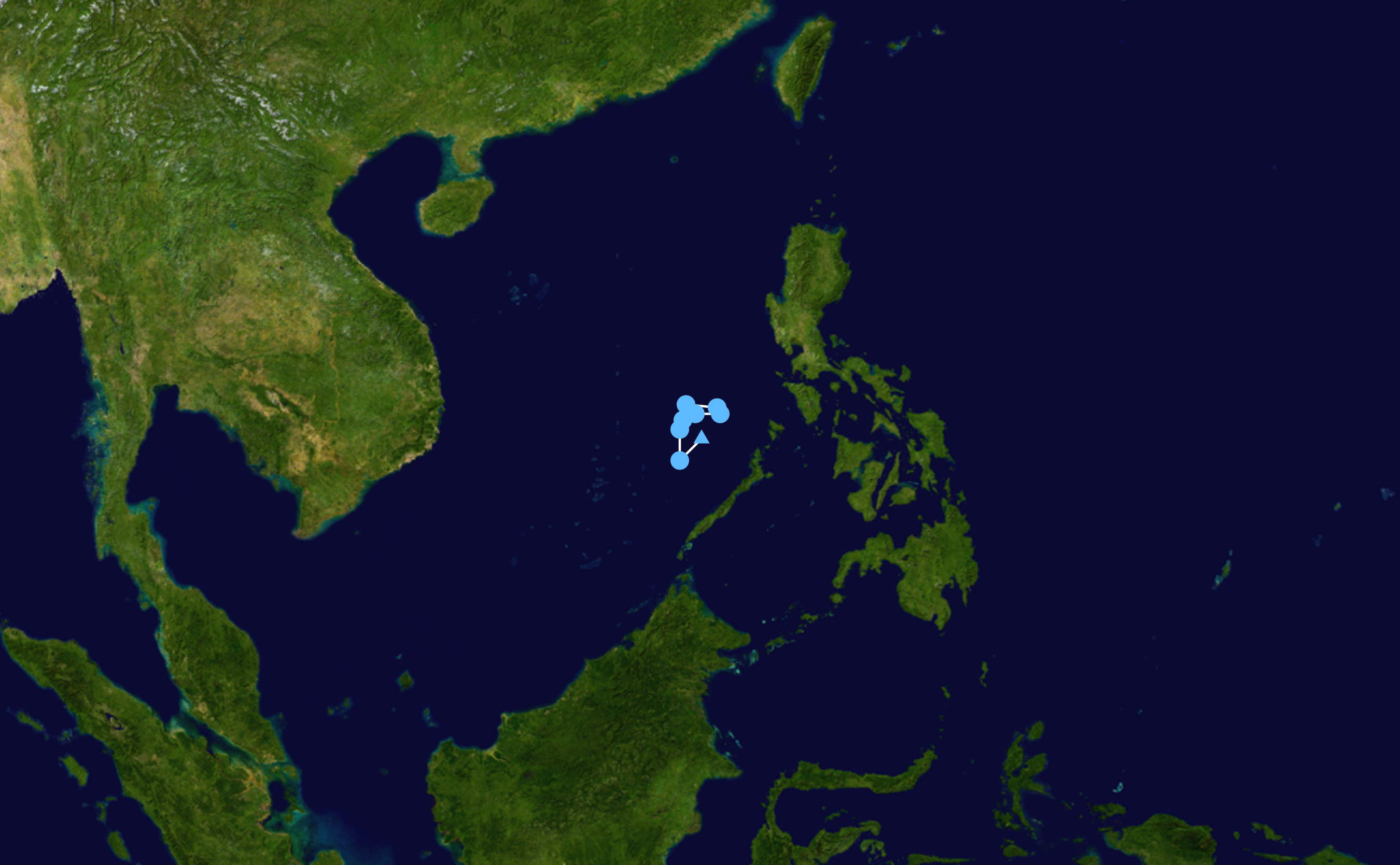
- Duration: April 30 – May 1
- Peak intensity: 55 km/h (35 mph) (10-min);

On April 29, the JTWC reported that an area of deep convection had persisted near the center of an elongated low-level circulation center, in area of low vertical windshear, about 400 km (250 mi), to the west of Manila in the Philippines. Deep convective banding was curving into an eastern southern edges of the disturbance. During the day the disturbance gradually consolidated further under the influence of an anticyclone, as a result of this the JTWC issued a Tropical Cyclone Formation Alert on the system. Early the next morning PAGASA upgraded the disturbance to a tropical depression and named it as Crising as it reached its 10-minute peak windspeeds of 55 km/h (35 mph). Later that day the JTWC reported that Crising's low-level circulation center has weakened and was now poorly organized as it underwent a Fujiwhara effect with what was to become Typhoon Kujira (Dante). PAGASA kept issuing advisories on Crising until it weakened into a low-pressure area early on May 1.

Heavy rains produced by the outer bands of Crising caused flooding in western areas of the Philippines, affecting an estimated 2,500 people. The worst flooding occurred in Lucena City where ten villages were isolated. Areas along the Bucon and Inalmasinan Rivers were inundated and sustained significant crop losses. Several animals reportedly drowned in the region. Several roads were impassable due to landslides or were washed out by floodwaters. One bridge was destroyed in the town of Mercedes.

=== Typhoon Kujira (Dante) ===
- Very strong typhoon (JMA)
- Category 4 typhoon (SSHWS)
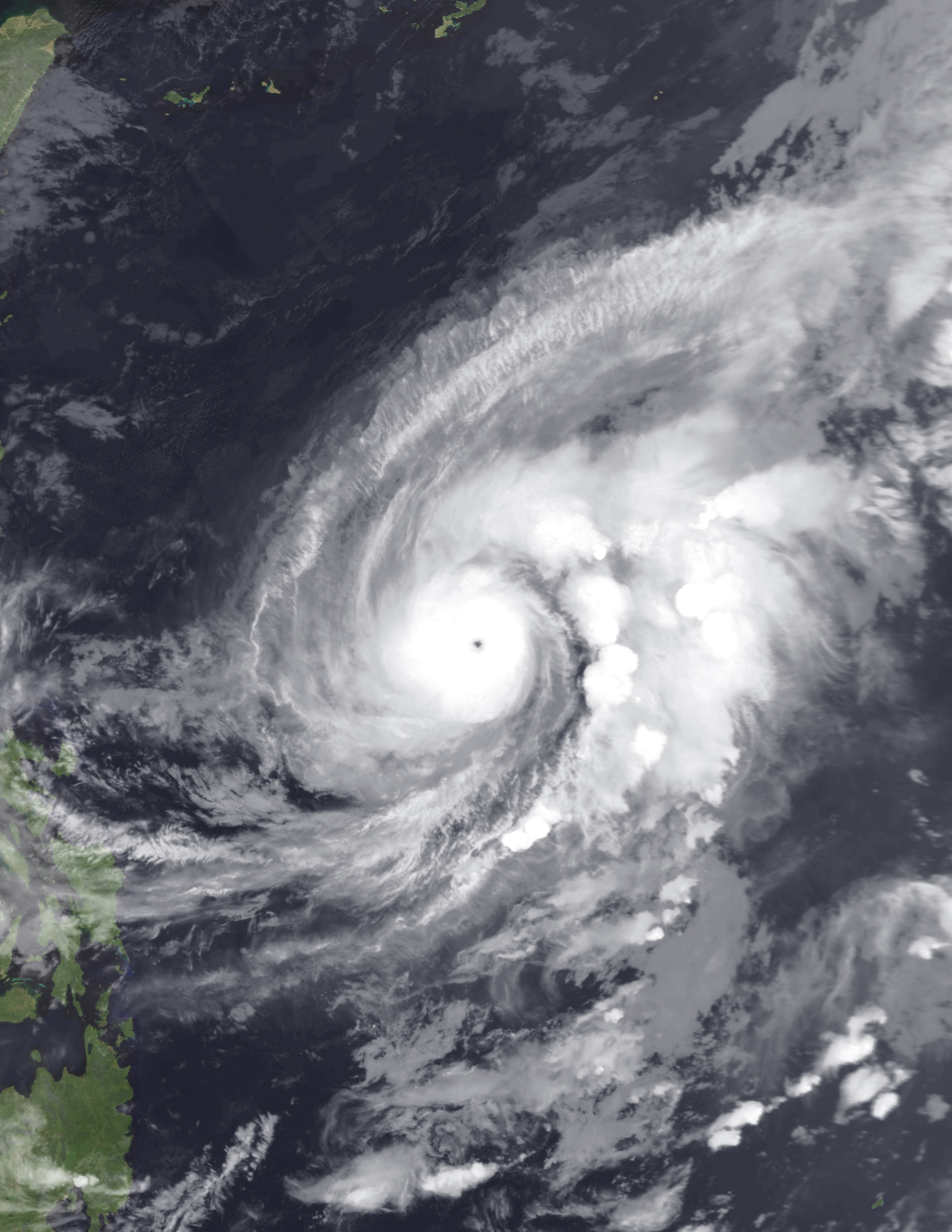
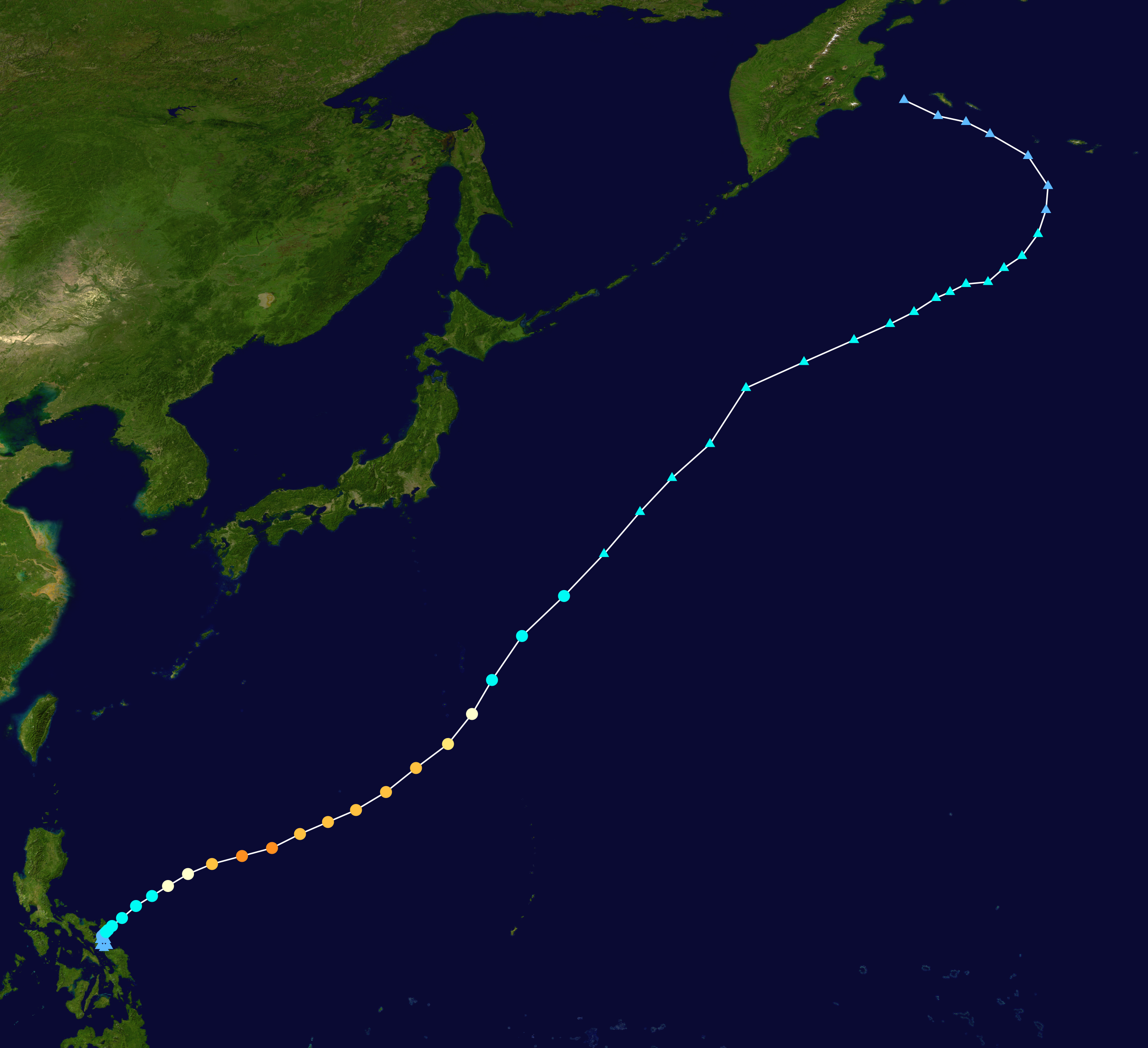
- Duration: May 1 – May 7
- Peak intensity: 155 km/h (100 mph) (10-min); 940 hPa (mbar)

Early on April 26, an area of disturbed weather formed near the coastline of Baler, capital of the Philippine's Aurora province. It was formerly a tail end of cold front that passed by Northern Luzon. JTWC assessed that the area of a disturbed weather potential of becoming developing into a significant Tropical Cyclone within 24 hours as "fair". However, on April 28, JTWC downgraded the disturbance as dissipating because of interaction with nearby middle Tropical Depression Crising and JMA Tropical Depression 03. A few days later, the disturbance moved south-westward, and late on April 30, the disturbance made landfall at Albay. On May 1, JTWC again upgraded the disturbance into having a potential to form into a significant Tropical Cyclone within 24 hours to "fair". And later that day, PAGASA classified the disturbance as a tropical depression, naming it "Dante" and issued public storm warning signal number one in the provinces of Camarines Norte, Camarines Sur, Albay, Sorsogon, Catanduanes, Masbate, Burias Island, and Southern Quezon. PAGASA also reported that Dante made landfall in the vicinity of Sorsogon within the Bicol region of the Philippines. Early on May 2, JTWC issued a TCFA as the depression was in an almost stationary position. Later that day, JMA classified Dante as a full depression. Early the next morning it became a tropical storm and was named Kujira. Kujira continued to strengthen and was upgraded to a severe tropical storm that afternoon. When it was over the Philippines it killed 27 people while 9 others are missing. The JMA upgraded the system to a typhoon early on May 4. Kujira intensified quickly, doubling in strength from a Category 2 typhoon to a Category 4-equivalent typhoon within 24 hours. On May 6, The JTWC reported that Kujira was in its beginning stages of becoming extratropical, with the low-level circulation center almost fully exposed in association with increasing vertical wind shear and lower sea surface temperatures in the region. Late that, JMA downgraded Kujira to a Severe Tropical Storm as strong wind shear weakens the system. Then early on May 7, JTWC issued its last advisory on Kujira, already reporting it as an extratropical system. JMA continued to issue warnings on the system while at the same time it was downgraded to a tropical storm. Later on May 7, Kujira weakened further, becoming a fully extratropical cyclone.

While in the Philippine area of responsibility, Kujira caused some 625,709,464 worth of damage to crops and livestock in Albay, Camarines Norte, Masbate and Sorsogon. It also caused some 102 million pesos worth of damage to communal irrigation systems in the region. The NDCC update as of 6AM PST May 12 declared 28 dead, one missing and 5 injured. Further, 383,457 persons in 609 barangays of 60 municipalities and 4 cities in 5 provinces of Region V were affected by the storm. Damages are worth PhP 1,228,422,344 million or PhP1.228 billion of which PhP 625,709,464 are agricultural losses and PhP 529.525 million in infrastructural. Houses destroyed were at 2387, of which 138 were total and 2249 partial.

=== Typhoon Chan-hom (Emong) ===
- Typhoon (JMA)
- Category 2 typhoon (SSHWS)
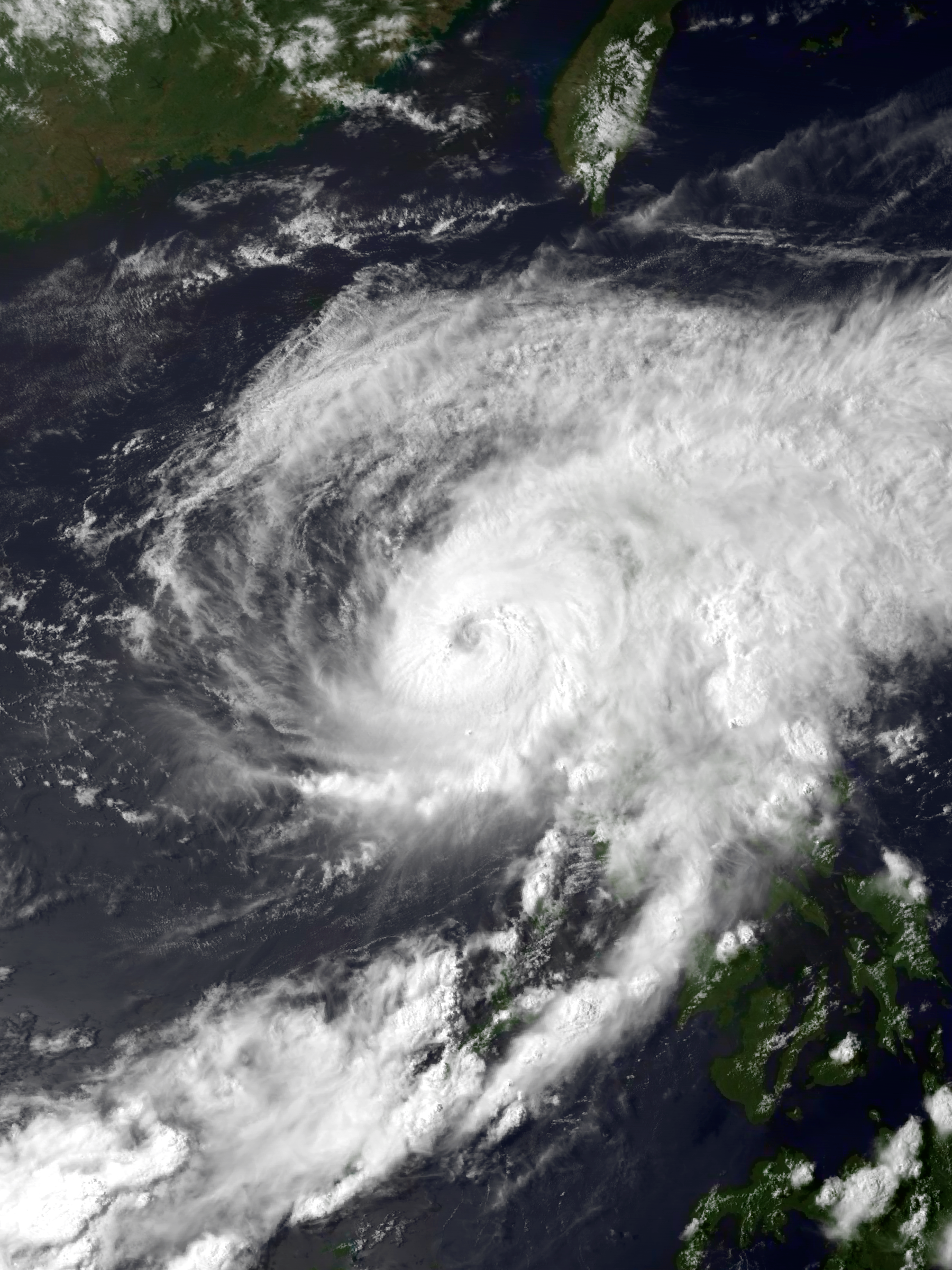
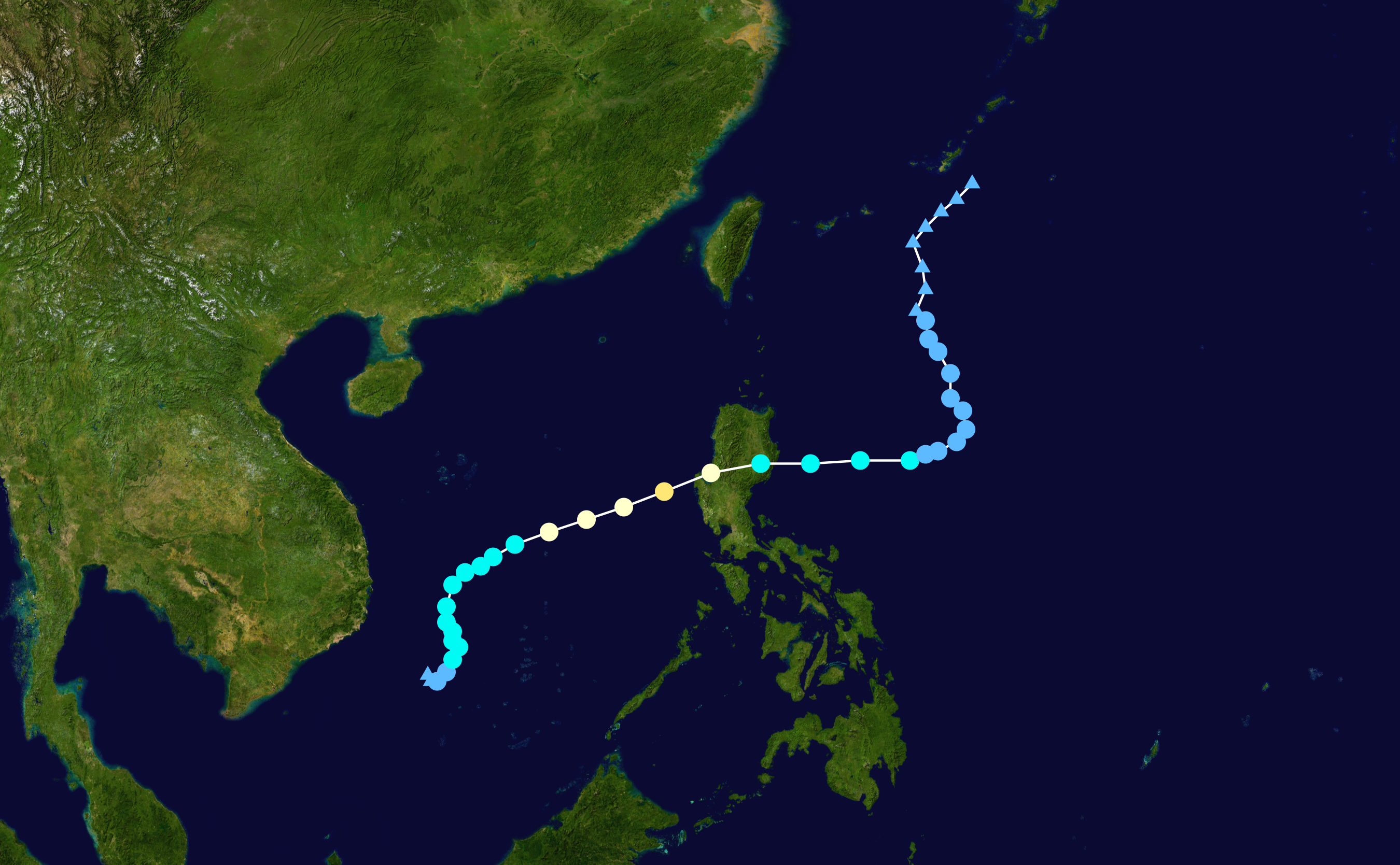
- Duration: May 2 – May 9
- Peak intensity: 120 km/h (75 mph) (10-min); 975 hPa (mbar)

On May 1, an area of convectional cloudiness associated with an area of disturbed weather formed southeast of Nha Trang, Vietnam and associated with a remnant of Tropical depression Crising to form a new stronger area of disturbed weather system. JTWC monitored the disturbance as "Fair" for developing due to low vertical wind shear and an upper-level anticyclone to the east of the system. Later on the JMA designated the low pressure as a minor tropical depression reporting the outlook track as southwestward. The JTWC issued a TCFA on the system once the convection increased and became better organized although with an exposed LLC east of its convection. Early morning of May 3, the JMA begun issuing tropical cyclone advisories on the system forecasting it to become a tropical storm later in the afternoon as it tracked eastwards. On May 3, the JTWC designated the disturbance as Tropical Depression 02W, and the JMA named the storm Chan-hom. Later on May 4, Chan-hom strengthened into a severe tropical storm. On May 6, the system moved into the Philippine Area of Responsibility from the west and was named as Emong. Later that day the JMA upgraded the severe tropical storm to a typhoon. On May 7, PAGASA reported that Chan-hom had made landfall at the northern tip of Bani, Pangasinan. After traversing Pangasinan it lashed La Union, Ilocos Sur, Benguet, Nueva Vizcaya, Ifugao, Mt. Province, Kalinga and Isabela. Pangasinan (which recorded 150mm of rain from Emong) and La Union were the worst hit. The provinces in Central Luzon, Ilocos, Cordillera Administrative Region and Cagayan Valley, together with Metro Manila and parts of Southern Luzon, generally experienced more than 100 mm in the 24‑hour period on May 7. Rains, however, lasted from May 6–8. NDCC updates on 6:00AM on May 13 put dead at 50, injured at 47 and missing at 13 and damage worth 690 million pesos in agriculture, infrastructure and private property. It further left 204,000 persons affected, damaged 23280 houses of which 6080 are totally damaged and 17200 partially damaged in Pangasinan and induced 11 landslide occurrences in Zambales and Cagayan PAGASA expected the typhoon to weaken quickly, which it did. On May 8, Chan-hom was downgraded to a Tropical Storm and later, to a Tropical Depression. JMA issued its last warning early on May 9, followed by the JTWC. PAGASA held on to Emong (Chan-hom) until much later that day, when it was declared an area of low pressure. JTWC then re-issued advisories on the restrengthening depression on May 10. Later on May 11, Chan-hom became a subtropical depression, therefore, JMA and PAGASA designated it a tropical depression while JTWC declared it dissipated, PAGASA reported Tropical Depression Chan-hom degenerated into Subtropical Disturbance ex-Chan-hom and issued the final advisory for the system because it had almost completely dissipated. However, JMA did not issue the final advisory for the tropical depression until early on May 13, when the storm's low-level circulation dissipated and began accelerate northeastward, as it was caught up in the jet stream, at which time it was forecast to become extratropical or be absorbed by a cold front.

=== Severe Tropical Storm Linfa ===
- Severe tropical storm (JMA)
- Category 1 typhoon (SSHWS)
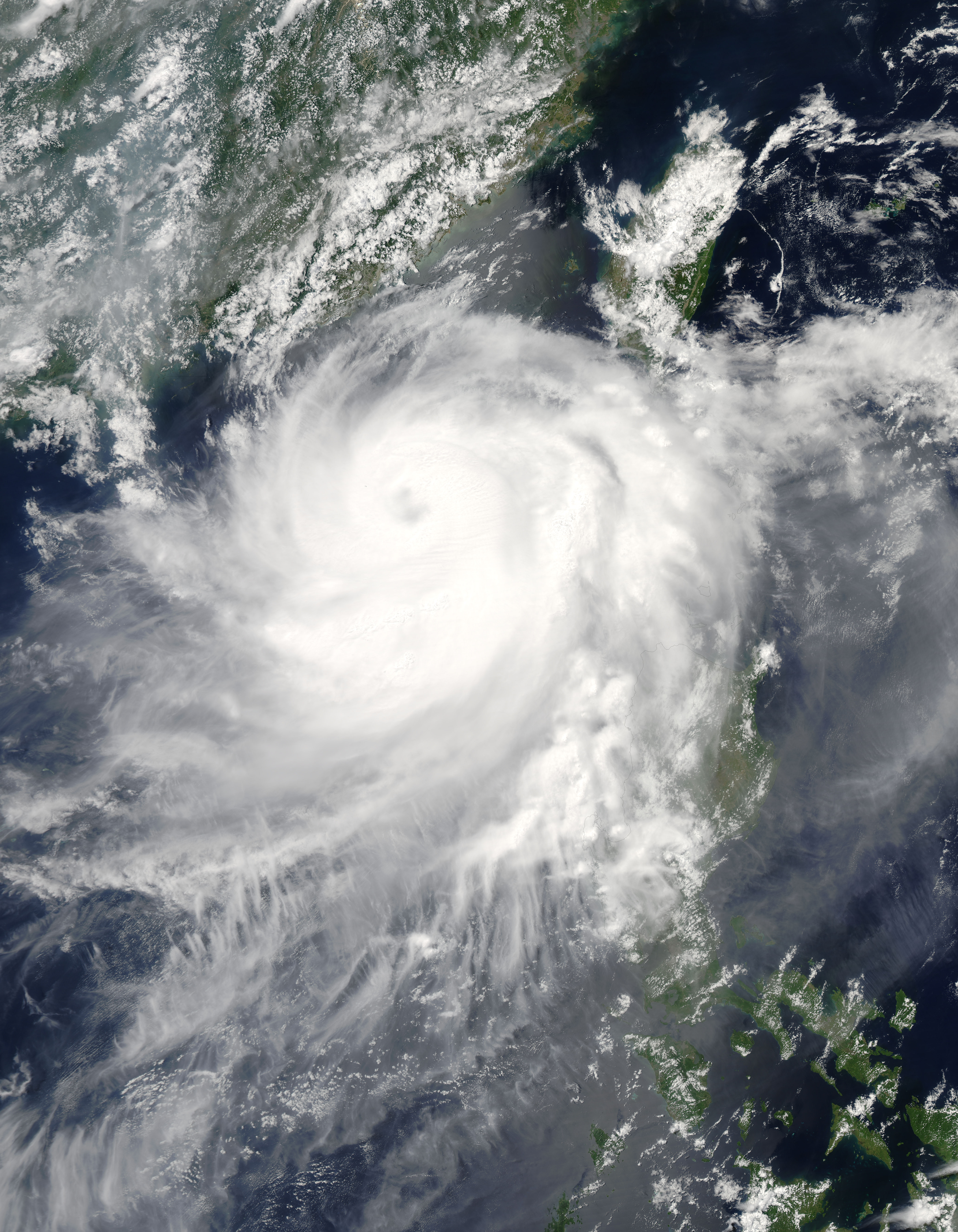
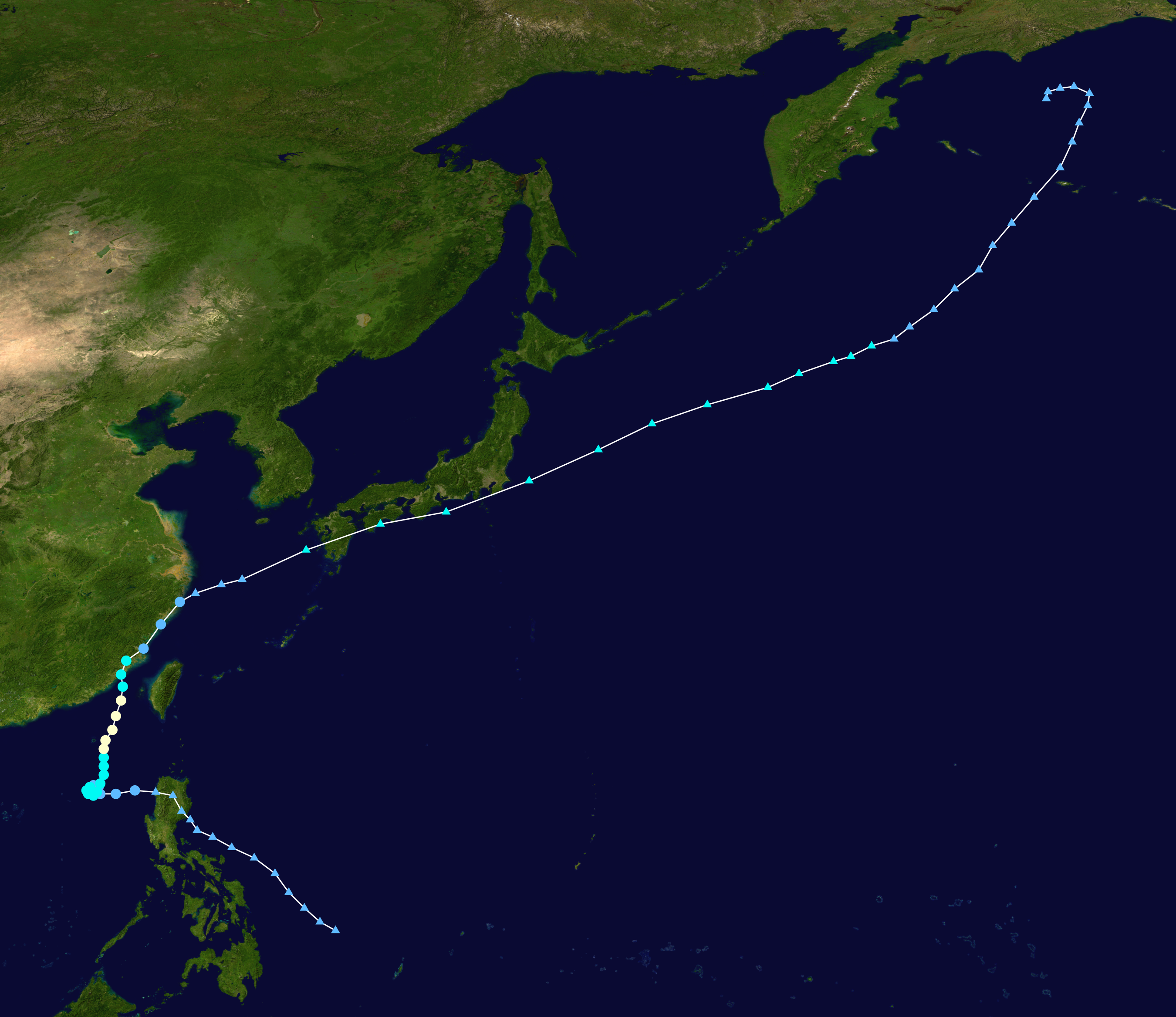
- Duration: June 14 – June 23
- Peak intensity: 110 km/h (70 mph) (10-min); 975 hPa (mbar)

On June 10, the JTWC began monitoring an area of disturbed weather that was situated about 140 km (87 mi) southeast of Palau. The disturbance had an elongated low-level circulation, with deep convection centered along the southwestern portion of the system. Over the next couple of days, the disturbance gradually developed with the JMA declaring the system as a tropical depression early on June 14 whilst the JTWC issued a TCFA. However the TCFA was cancelled later that day due to the convection dissipating, whilst the JMA downgraded the depression to an area of low pressure. Over the next two days, the system moved across Luzon and began to regenerate. Early on June 17, a second TCFA was released by the JTWC whilst the JMA reported that the system had re-intensified into a tropical depression. Later that day, the JTWC designated the system as Tropical Depression 03W whilst the storm was situated about 705 km (438 mi) south-southwest of Kaohsiung, Taiwan. Following further development of the depression, the JTWC upgraded it to a tropical storm late on June 17. The JMA then followed suit early the next morning assigning the name Linfa to the storm. Throughout the rest of the day limited poleward outflow prevented linfa from intensifying. During June 19, Linfa intensified further and became a severe tropical storm with an eye feature starting to appear on microwave imagery. After interacting with a nearby upper-level low, outflow significantly improved later that day, fueling further strengthening, before the next day the JTWC upgraded Linfa to a typhoon as it reached its peak windspeeds of 140 km/h (85 mph) 110 km/h (68 mph) 10-minute winds). Later that day convection near the center of the circulation to decrease with the eye no longer visible. Upper-level wind shear rapidly increased, preventing re-intensification of the cyclone. Linfa then began to interact with land and was downgraded to a tropical storm by the JTWC on June 21 and then during that afternoon the storm made landfall on the southern Chinese province of Fujian. Deep convection then rapidly dissipated with both the JMA and the JTWC downgrading Linfa to a Tropical depression by early on June 22, as the storm moved away from the Chinese coastline. The system later dissipated just offshore with a circulation was no longer evident on satellite imagery.

A total of seven people were killed by Linfa, whilst $110 million (2009 USD) worth of damage was done by Linfa, as it affected China, Taiwan, Hong Kong and the Philippines. A 498-tonne oil tanker was run aground in southern Taiwan by large swells of up to 5.6 m (18 ft). In Taiwan two people were hit by fallen trees, whilst power cuts were reported in Chiangchun as well as other parts of China and Taiwan. A total loss of NT$400 million, (12.1 million 2009 USD) was suffered by the agricultural sector in Taiwan whilst in mainland China, Linfa produced torrential rainfall which led to severe flooding. Following a landslide, one person was killed. Flood waters destroyed 100 homes and inundated 10,000 others as well as an estimated 32,000 hectares of farmland in Fujian Province. In Meizhou, Guongdong Province, flash flooding resulted in five additional fatalities after 413.7 mm 19.22 in of rain fell within a nine-hour span. A total of 362 homes were destroyed in the town and infrastructure was severely damaged. Additionally, an estimated 20 million people were affected by the storm.

=== Tropical Storm Nangka (Feria) ===
- Tropical storm (JMA)
- Tropical storm (SSHWS)
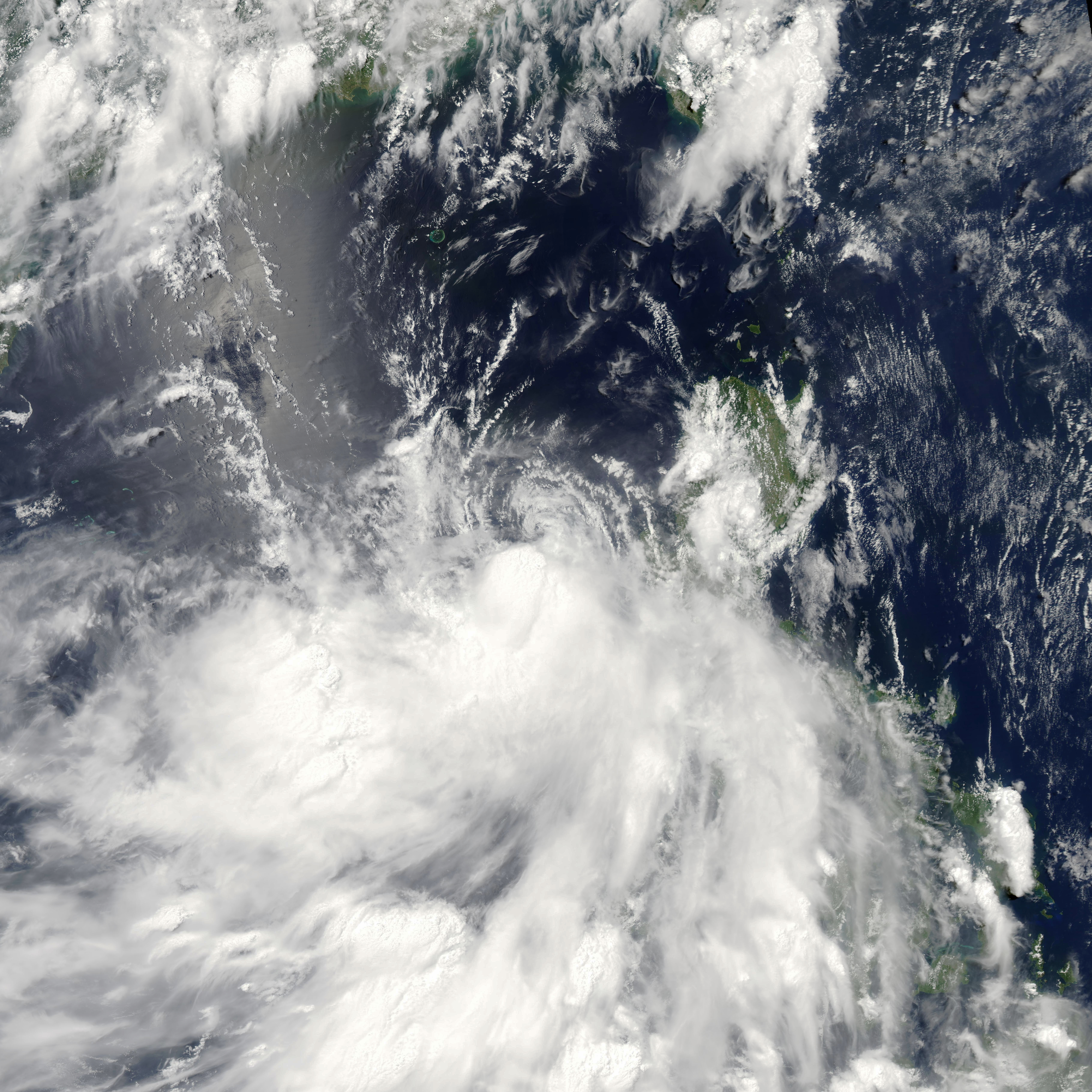
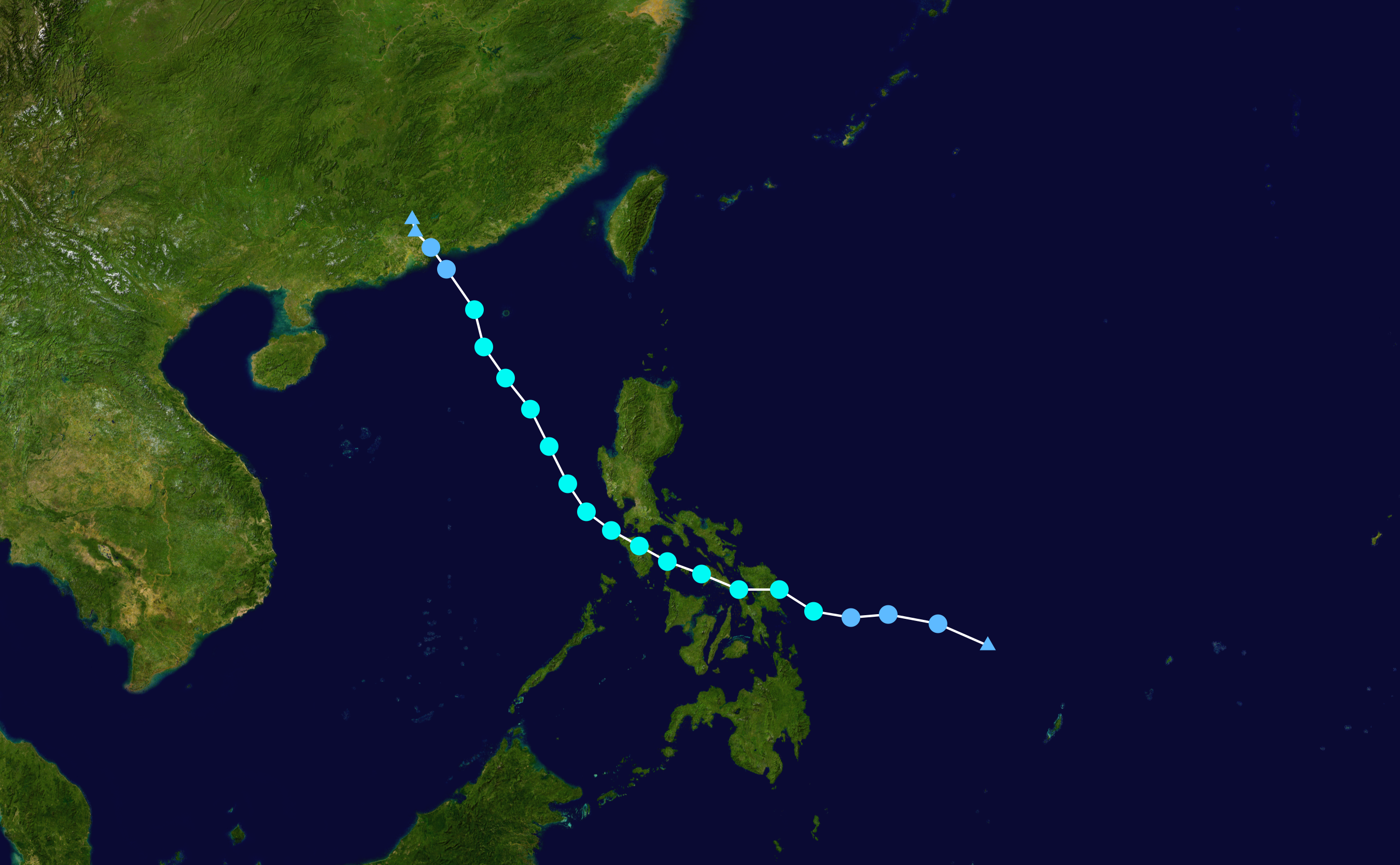
- Duration: June 22 – June 27
- Peak intensity: 75 km/h (45 mph) (10-min); 994 hPa (mbar)

On June 16, an area of disturbed weather formed about 170 km (110 mi) to the northeast of Palau Island. In the next few days, the disturbance showed improvement but, its LLCC was undefined. Early on June 20, the disturbance suddenly strengthened and its LLCC began to consolidate as well as significant banding all over the system. The disturbance was also located under low vertical wind shear. Early on June 22, JTWC issued an advisory that the potential of the formation of a significant tropical cyclone within 24 hours was upgraded to "Fair" because of its well-defined LLCC and was located in a favorable area. Around 0600 UTC that same day, the JMA classified the disturbance as a minor Tropical Depression, while the JTWC released a TCFA on the disturbance. This was because convection had begun to organize and upper-level analysis showed a cyclonic center on the east, just west of Guam and a cyclonic flow around its consolidating low-level circulation Centre. After 4 hours, JTWC issued its first warning and named it as Tropical Depression 04W. Early on June 23, PAGASA issued its first warning on the Tropical Depression and assigned its local named "Feria". In the afternoon, Nangka made its first landfall over Hernani, Eastern Samar at 5:00 pm PST (0900 UTC). and made its second landfall in Masbate around 10:00PM PST ( 1400 UTC). On June 24, Nangka rapidly slowed down while moving over Mindoro. The storm then made its third landfall at Calapan City, Mindoro at 12 am PST/ 0430 UTC. After crossing Mindoro for 8 hours, PAGASA downgraded Nangka into a Tropical Depression, while both the JMA and JTWC still classified Nangka as a tropical storm on that day. Early on June 25, Nangka move into the South China Sea, with PAGASA issuing their final warning. In the evening of that same day, both JMA and JTWC downgraded Nangka into a tropical depression due to its low-level circulation center is started to deteriorate. By midday of June 26, it made its fourth landfall in Guangdong province in China, passing through the northern part of Hong Kong. In the afternoon of that day, both JMA and JTWC issued their final warning on Nangka. Its remnants completely dissipated by June 27.

In Eastern Samar, more than 800 people were stranded after ferry service was canceled. High winds downed a large tree, destroying the roof of one home and damaging three cars. Unusually strong severe thunderstorms developed over parts of the Philippines along the outer bands of Nangka. In San Pascual, Bauan and Batangas City, large hail fell during a strong storm. Residents reported that they have never seen hail before. In Barangay, 4 in Bauan town, a rare tornado struck, downing several trees, damaging homes and signs. Heavy rains produced by the storm also flooded numerous regions, some reporting waist-deep water. Later reports confirmed the tornado destroyed 23 homes. In Cebu, one person was killed and seven were left missing. At least 500 people were also left homeless due to the storm. In Cavite, 7000 was stranded on the port due to Nangka's winds and heavy rains. about 4 feet (1.2 m) is the water wave in Cavite. In Albay, more than 300 ship passengers were also stranded at the Albay port, Tabaco, Albay. In Navotas and Malabon, the Navotas — Malabon river produced a 3-foot (0.91 m) high tide in the area.

Nangka (Feria) caused 6 deaths and left 11 people missing. Property damage from the storm is estimated at PHP 2.8 million (US$54,000).

=== Tropical Storm Soudelor (Gorio) ===
- Tropical storm (JMA)
- Tropical storm (SSHWS)
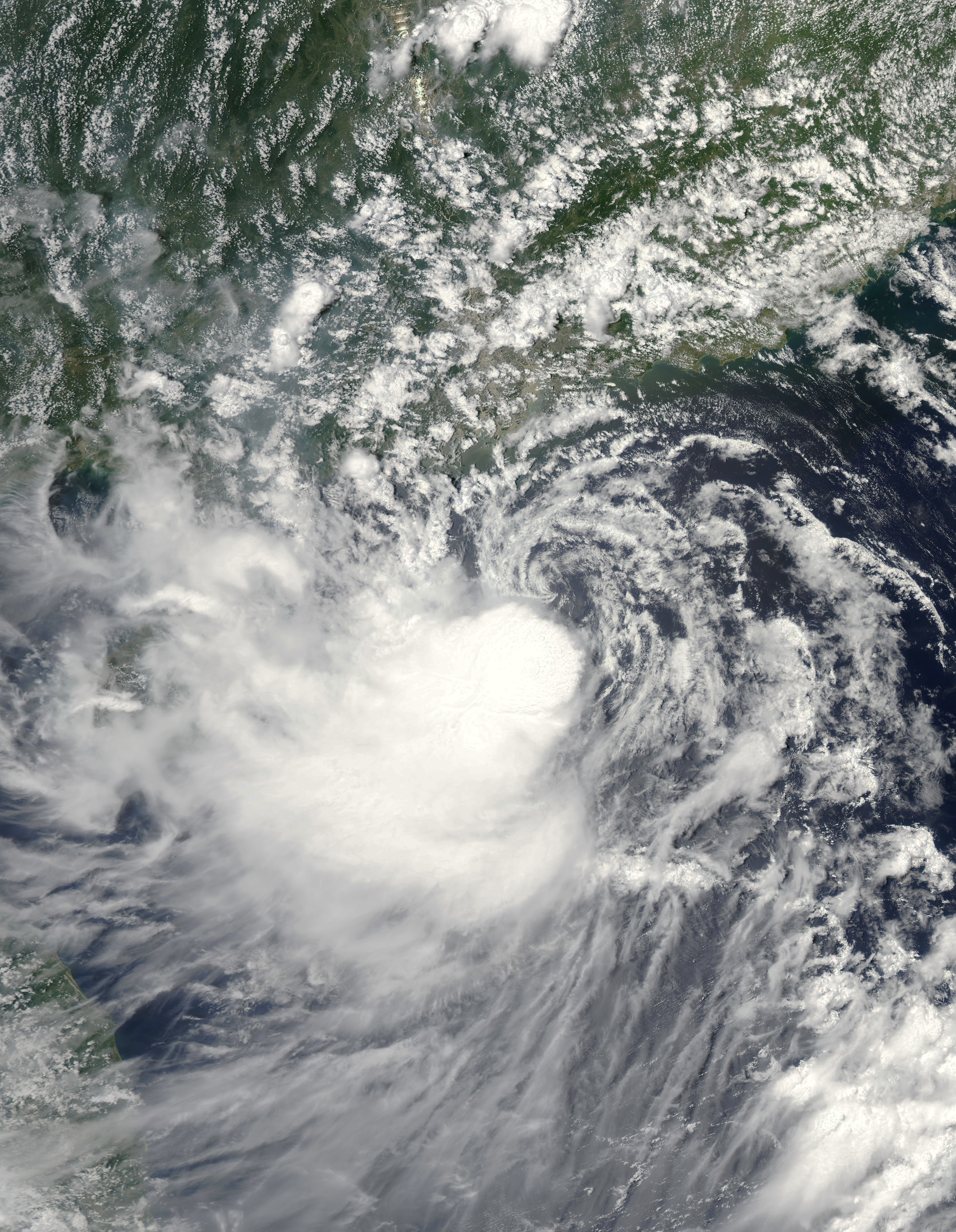
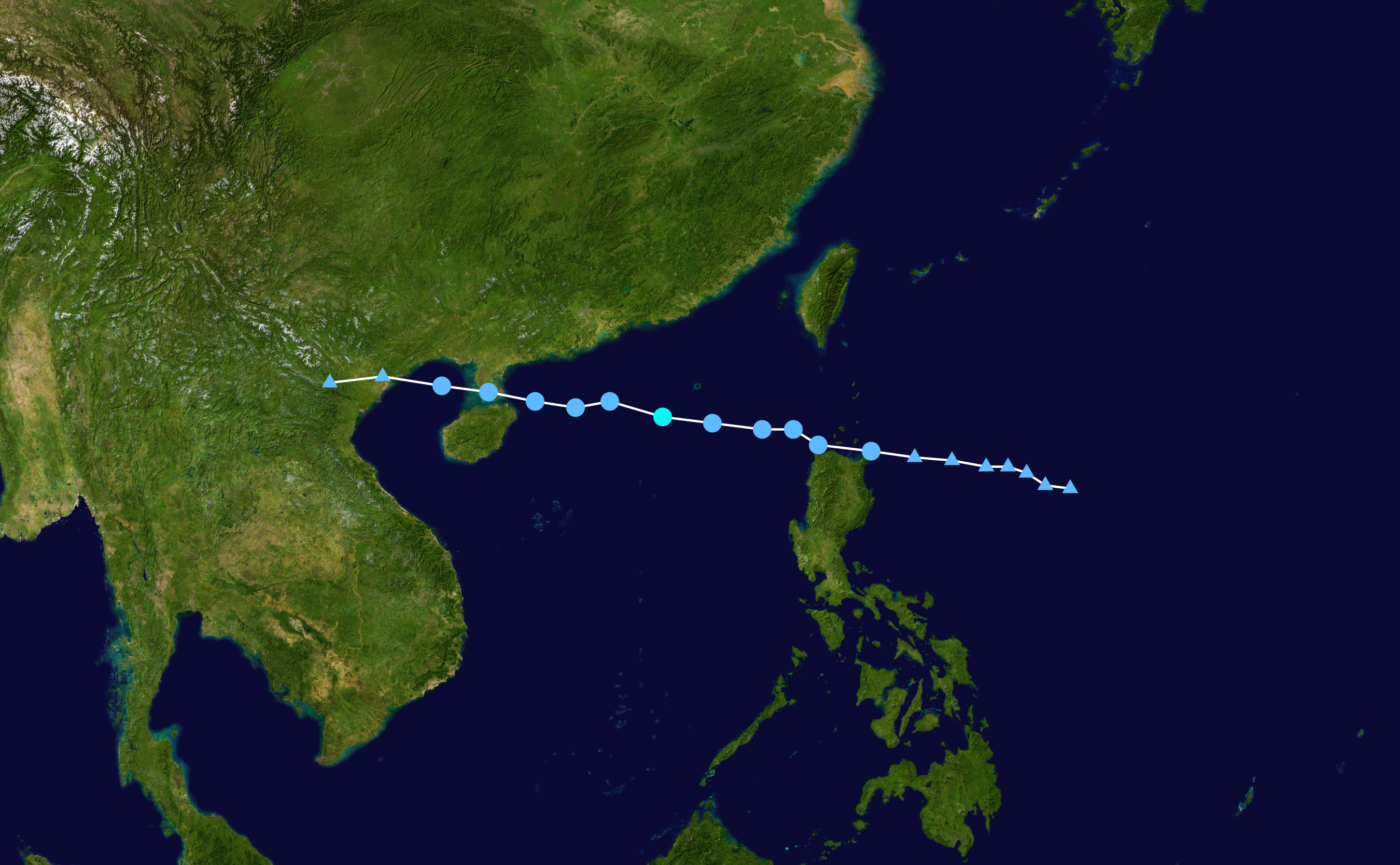
- Duration: July 9 – July 13
- Peak intensity: 65 km/h (40 mph) (10-min); 992 hPa (mbar)

Late on July 7, the JTWC reported that an area of disturbed weather had formed about 900 km (560 mi) to the northwest of Yap. Deep convection was embedded in a broad, weak, poorly defined circulation that was starting to be enhanced by a tropical upper tropospheric trough (TUTT) cell to the east of the system. Over the next couple of days, gradual development took place before a TCFA was released by the JTWC early on July 9 as PAGASA designated the system as Tropical Depression Gorio. Later that day both the JMA and the JTWC reported that the depression had formed and started to issue warnings on the depression, with the JTWC designating it as 05W. On July 10, PAGASA issued their final advisory on Tropical Depression Gorio as it moved out of their area of responsibility. Hampered by an unfavorable upper-level environment, the depression barely intensified into a tropical storm early on July 11. Upon becoming a tropical storm, the JMA named the system Soudelor reporting peak winds of 65 km/h (40 mph). Later that day the JTWC reported that Soudelor had weakened into a depression; however they re-upgraded it to a tropical storm as it moved closer to Hainan Province. Shortly before landfall in Leizhou Peninsula, China, the JTWC downgraded the storm to a tropical depression, then as Soudelor moved back over water and into the Gulf of Tonkin, the JTWC issued their final advisory on the depression, however the JMA continued to monitor the storm until it had made landfall near Fangchenggang, China several hours later.

As a tropical depression, Soudelor brushed northern Luzon in the Philippines, producing upwards of 330 mm (13 in) of rainfall which resulted in flash flooding and landslides in at least ten villages. In China torrential rains in Hainan caused significant flooding that killed 15 hikers and left several others missing. Numerous roads were also cut off or destroyed by landslides and 30 villages were inundated with flood waters. The remnants of Soudelor produced widespread torrential rains in Northern Vietnam on July 13. Rainfall totals peaked at 250 mm (9.8 in) in the region. Heavy rainfall, amounting to 130 mm (5.1 in), was also recorded in Hanoi. The capital city experienced flash flooding, inundating numerous streets and buildings. Two men were killed by lightning strikes associated with the storm. Officials reported that at least 13 large trees had been downed by high winds. Flood waters in the hardest-hit areas reached a depth of 0.35 m (1.1 ft). One person was killed after being swept away. A tornado also touched down during the storm, destroying the roofs of three homes. Thousands of hectares of croplands were inundated by flood waters. Following the storm, 1,000 tonnes of rice was allocated for victims of the floods.

=== Tropical Depression 06W (Huaning) ===
- Tropical depression (JMA)
- Tropical depression (SSHWS)
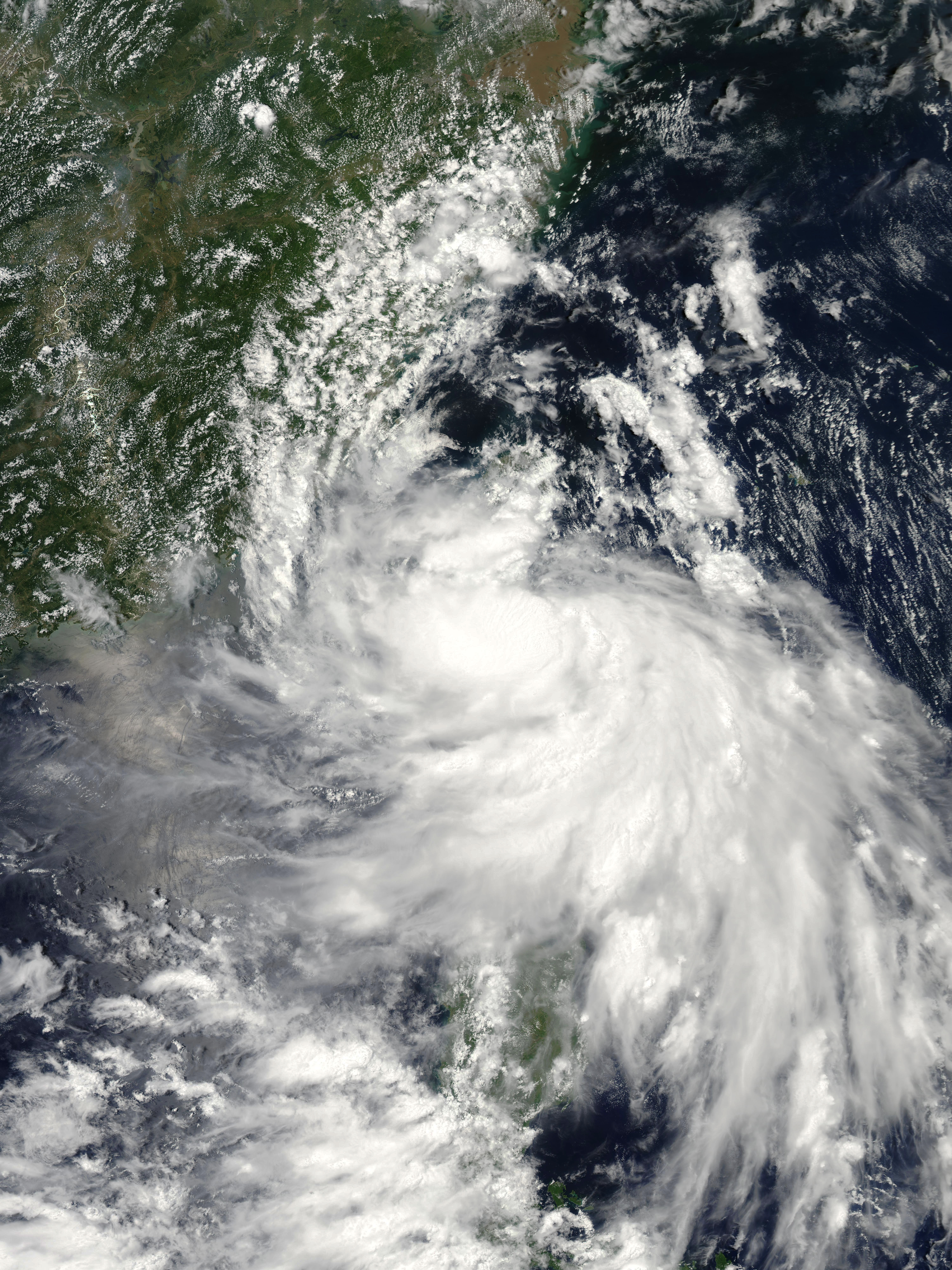
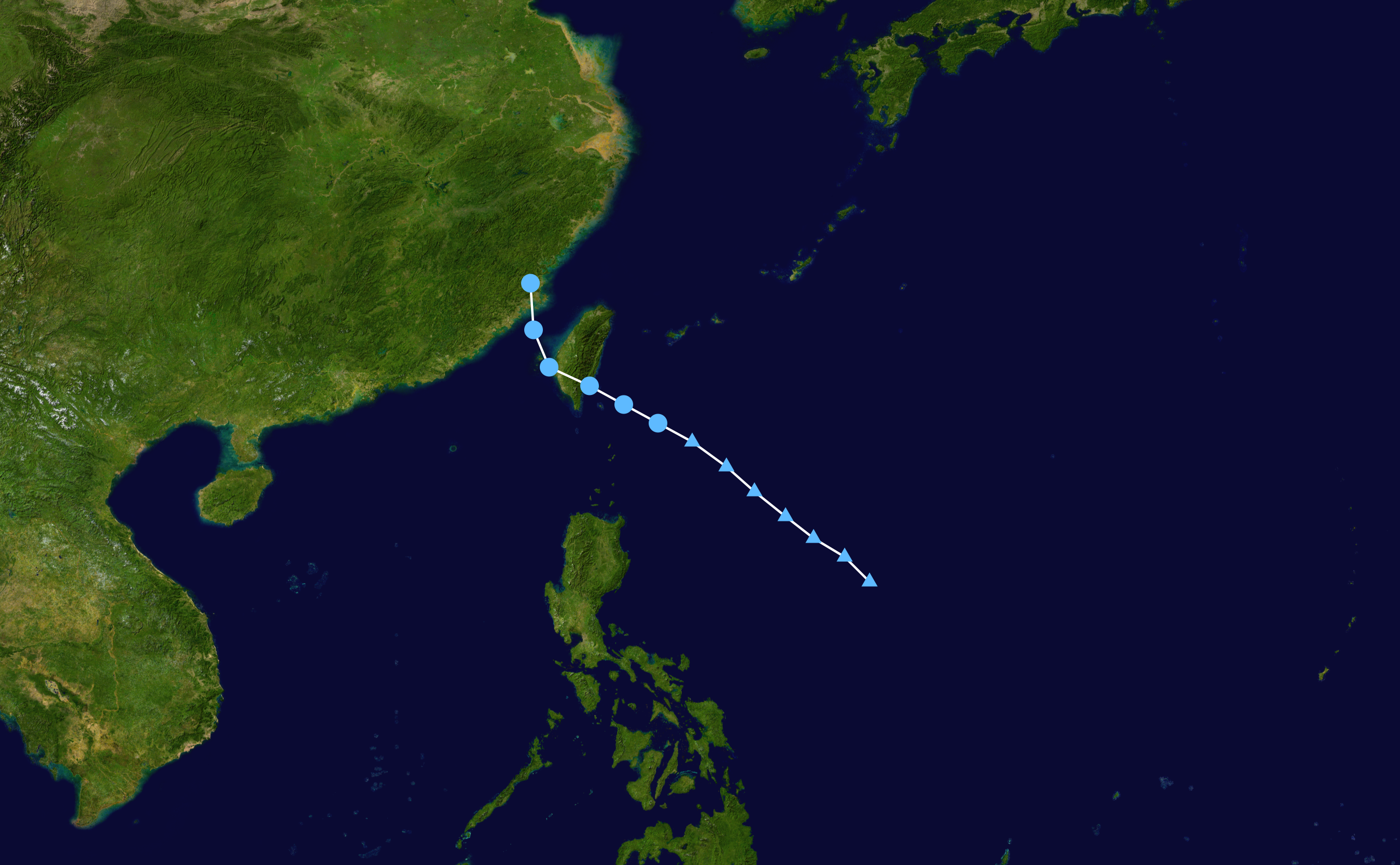
- Duration: July 11 – July 14
- Peak intensity: 55 km/h (35 mph) (10-min); 1000 hPa (mbar)

On July 10, the JTWC reported that an area of disturbed weather had persisted about 1,065 km (662 mi) to the east of Manila. The convection was consolidating with a good mid-level circulation and was located under an anticyclone and had started to show some outflow into a trough to the northeast of the system. Early the next day the JMA reported that the disturbance had become a minor tropical depression. The depression then gradually developed during the rest of July 11, with PAGASA naming the depression as Huaning early on July 12 whilst the JTWC issued a Tropical Cyclone Formation Alert on the depression. Early the next day PAGASA upgraded Huaning into a tropical storm whilst the JTWC designated the depression as Tropical Depression 06W. Later that morning Huaning made its first landfall over Taitung City, Taiwan. On the next day, both JMA and JTWC issued their final warning on Huaning.

=== Typhoon Molave (Isang) ===
- Typhoon (JMA)
- Category 1 typhoon (SSHWS)
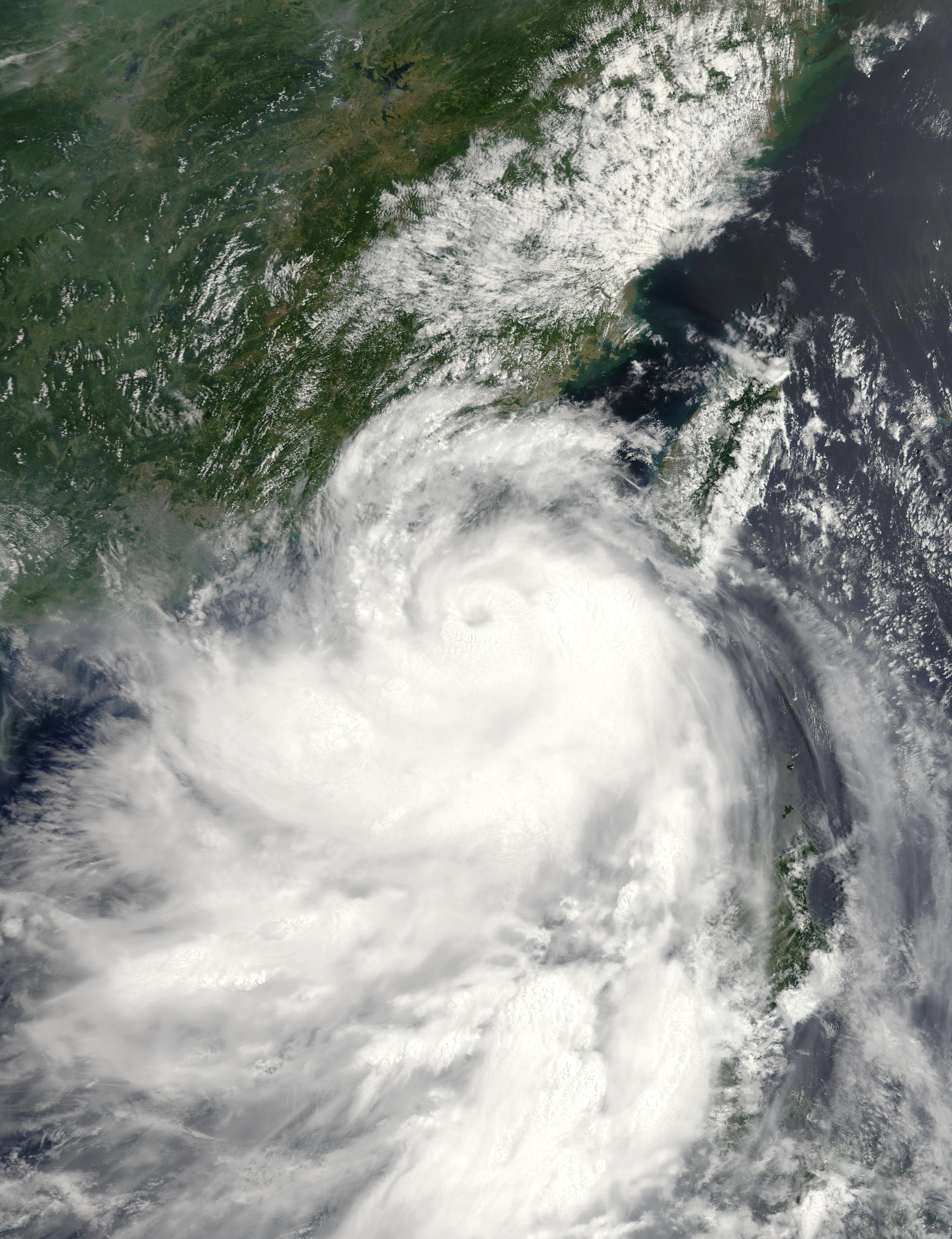
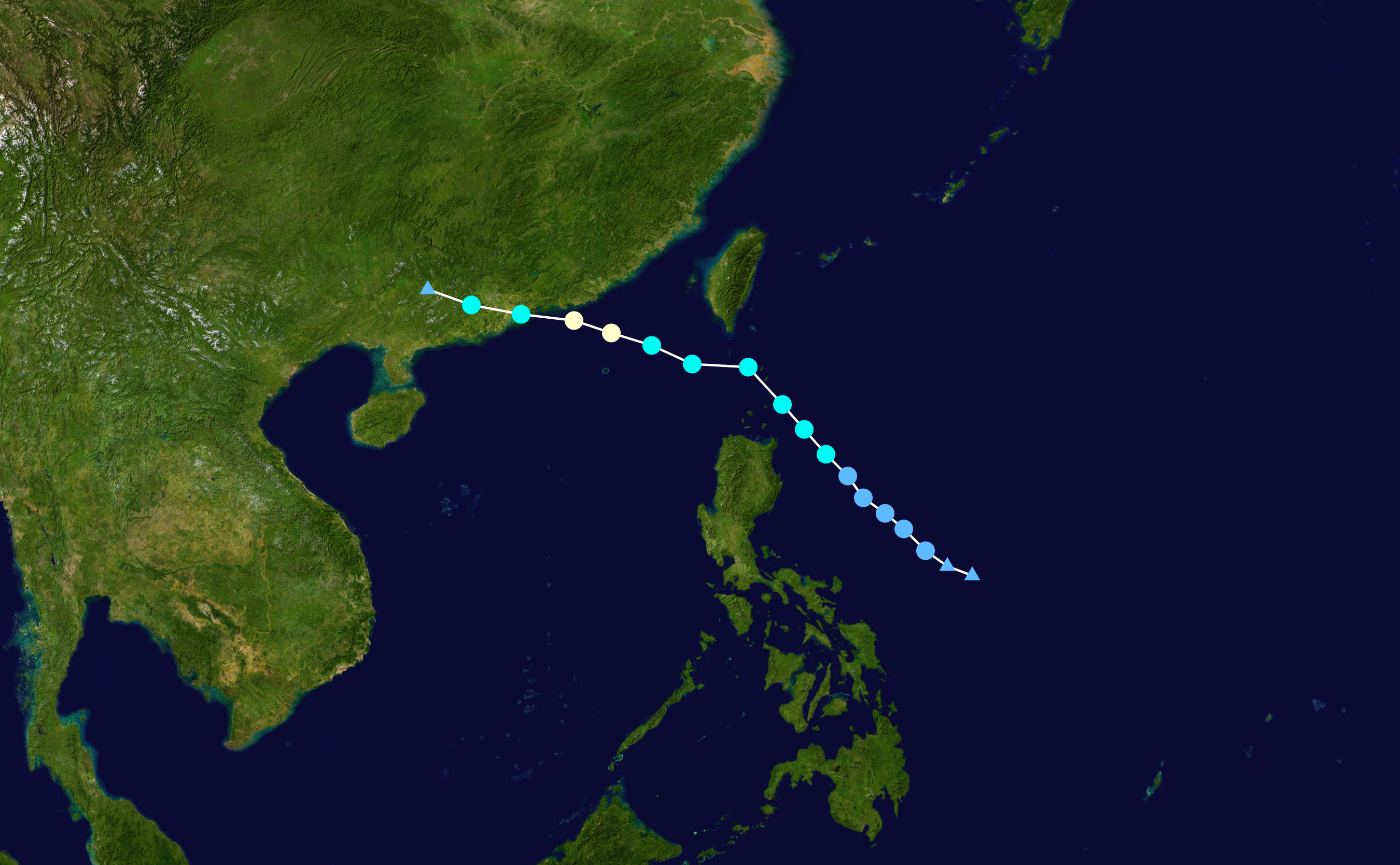
- Duration: July 15 – July 19
- Peak intensity: 120 km/h (75 mph) (10-min); 975 hPa (mbar)

Late on July 10, an area of disturbed weather persisted about 280 km (170 mi), to the southeast of Yap. Convection was wrapping into a poorly organized and drawn out low-level circulation center and was under minimal wind shear. It gradually developed further throughout the next day with convection continuing to consolidate over a low-level circulation center. However, early on July 12, the JTWC reported that the disturbance had dissipated, as outflow was being hampered by the outflow of Huaning. However, late on July 13, the JTWC reported that the disturbance had rapidly redeveloped and released a TCFA on the disturbance. Early the next day both PAGASA and the JMA designated the disturbance as a Tropical Depression with PAGASA assigning the local name of Isang to the depression. The Depression continued to develop and was designated as Tropical Depression 07W by the JTWC early on July 15, whilst PAGASA upgraded Isang to a Tropical storm later that day. On July 17, JMA upgraded Molave as a Severe Tropical Storm and Typhoon by PAGASA. On morning of July 18, HKO upgraded Molave as a Typhoon. Later that day, Molave quickly moved into the South China Sea. On July 19, at 1700 UTC or 1am HKT, Molave made its first landfall. In the afternoon, as Molave moved through China, both JMA and JTWC issued their final warning as Molave weakened into a tropical depression. Molave killed at least four people.

=== Tropical Storm Goni (Jolina) ===
- Tropical storm (JMA)
- Tropical storm (SSHWS)
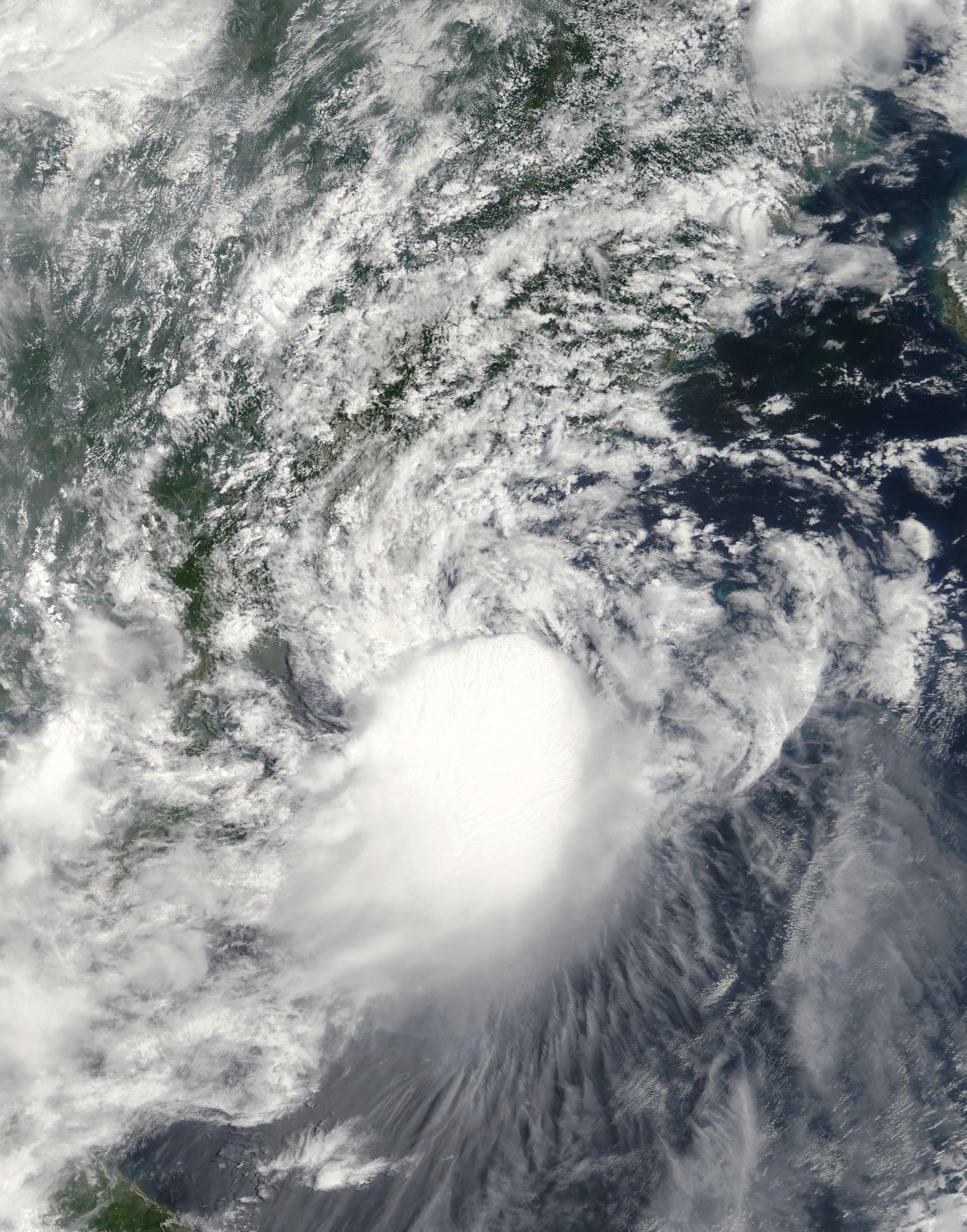
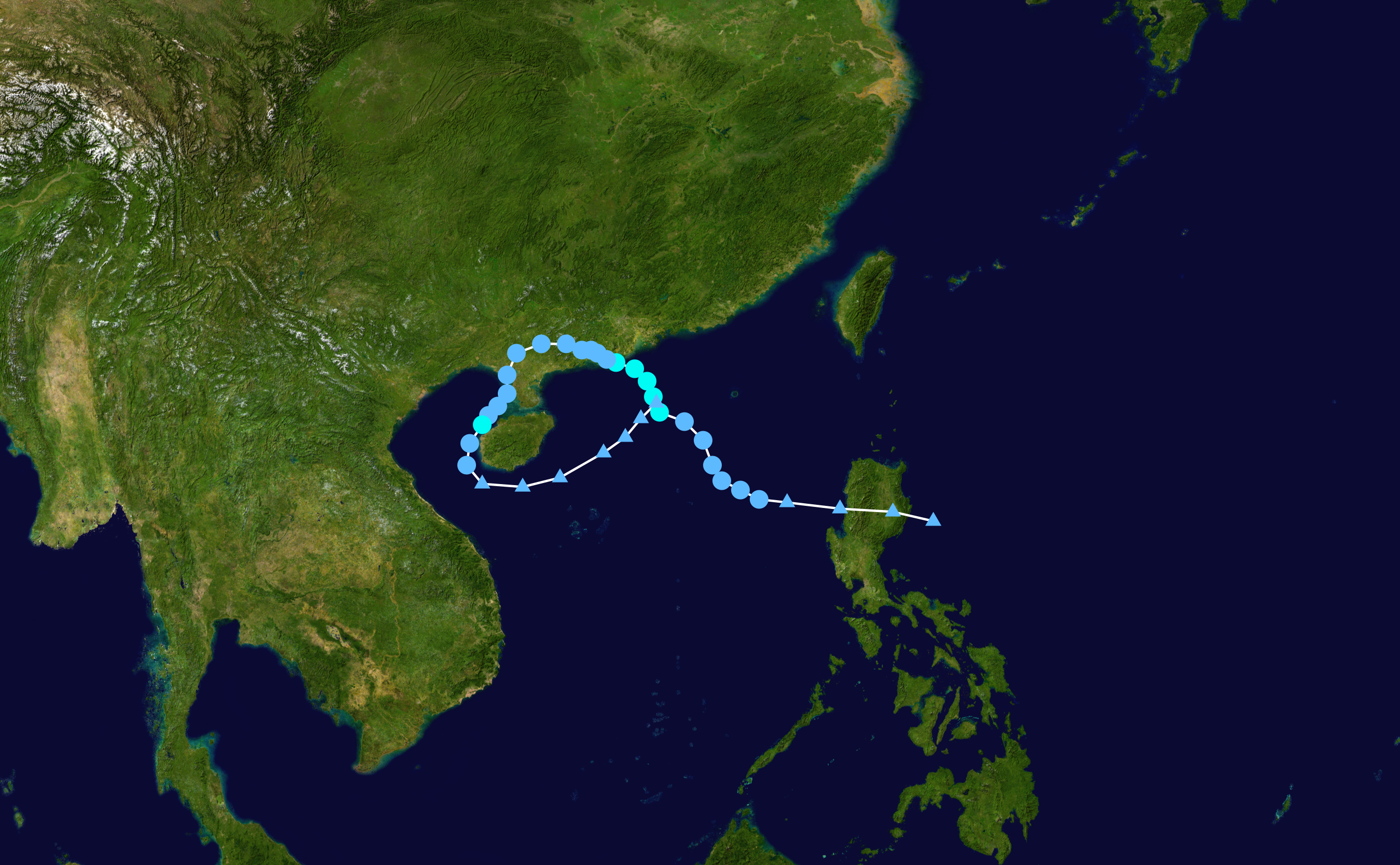
- Duration: July 30 – August 9
- Peak intensity: 75 km/h (45 mph) (10-min); 988 hPa (mbar)

Late on July 25, the JTWC reported that an area of convection had formed in a monsoon trough about 815 km (506 mi) to the northeast of Guam. Deep convection was flaring around the low-level circulation center. An upper-level anticyclone and a tropical upper tropospheric trough was providing outflow. Over the next few days the disturbance gradually developed before the disturbance was declared as dissipated early on July 28 as the low-level circulation center was not well defined and higher vertical wind shear affecting the system. However, the disturbance regenerated early on July 30 whilst located about 630 km (390 mi), the disturbance's low-level circulation center was elongated with indications of multiple circulation centers. Later that day PAGASA reported that the disturbance had developed into a tropical depression and assigned its local name of Jolina. Jolina then intensified further early the next day and was reported to have become a tropical storm by PAGASA, with the JMA designating it as a depression later that day. Early on August 1 the JTWC issued a Tropical Cyclone Formation Alert as deep convection had increased and was starting to consolidate around a circulation center. However, later that morning Jolina made a landfall near to Casiguran, in the Philippine province of Aurora before emerging out into the South China Sea later that day. Early the next day the JTWC reissued their TCFA whilst PAGASA issued their final warning on Jolina as it moved out of their area of responsibility heading towards a landfall on China. The JTWC then designated the depression as 08W later that day as infrared imagery had shown deep convection was wrapping into the low-level circulation center. During August 3, the JMA reported that the tropical depression had intensified into a tropical storm and assigned the Goni to the cyclone. At 1700 UTC of August 4, Goni made its second landfall over Macau. Early on the next day, JTWC issued their final warning on Goni. On August 7, The Joint Typhoon Warning noted that remnant of Goni re-entered into the Gulf of Tonkin and had a poor chance of regenerating. Later in the day, Joint Typhoon Warning Center reissued advisories on the system upgrading it to a tropical storm near Hainan Island.

In the Philippines Goni (Jolina) death toll is 8 with 5 more missing. Goni (Jolina) affected 38,589 families or 160,038 people in 119 villages in 25 towns and five cities in Ilocos Sur, Batangas, Cagayan, Nueva Ecija, Rizal, Mindoro Occidental, Palawan, Iloilo, Negros Occidental, Lanao del Sur, and Sultan Kudarat town in Maguindanao. Five people died in China when Goni passed through. In Hainan province about 92,000 people had been evacuated by the authorities. 575 houses were destroyed and 2,311 damaged. The storm also inundated than 68,000 hectares cropland.

=== Typhoon Morakot (Kiko) ===
- Typhoon (JMA)
- Category 1 typhoon (SSHWS)
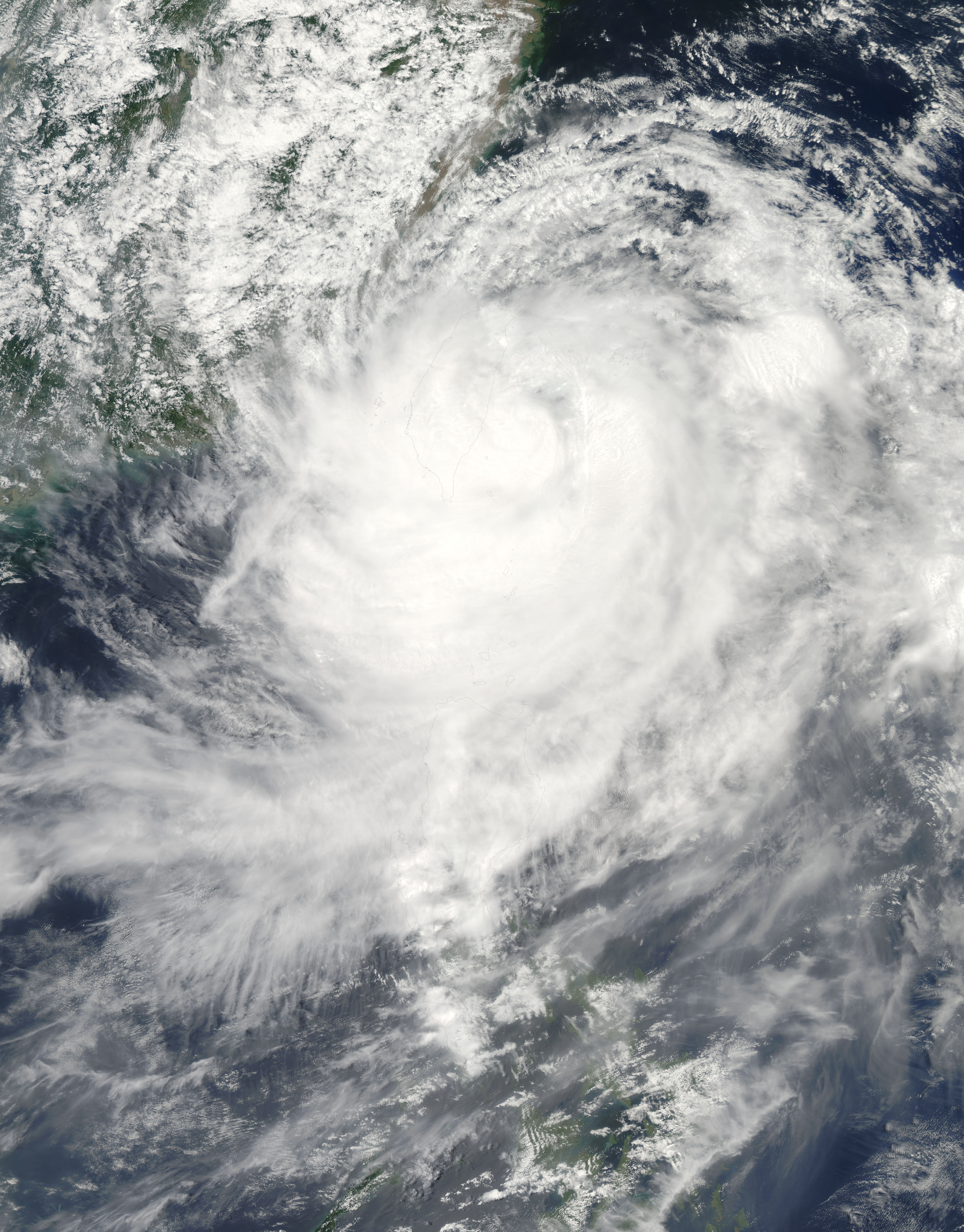
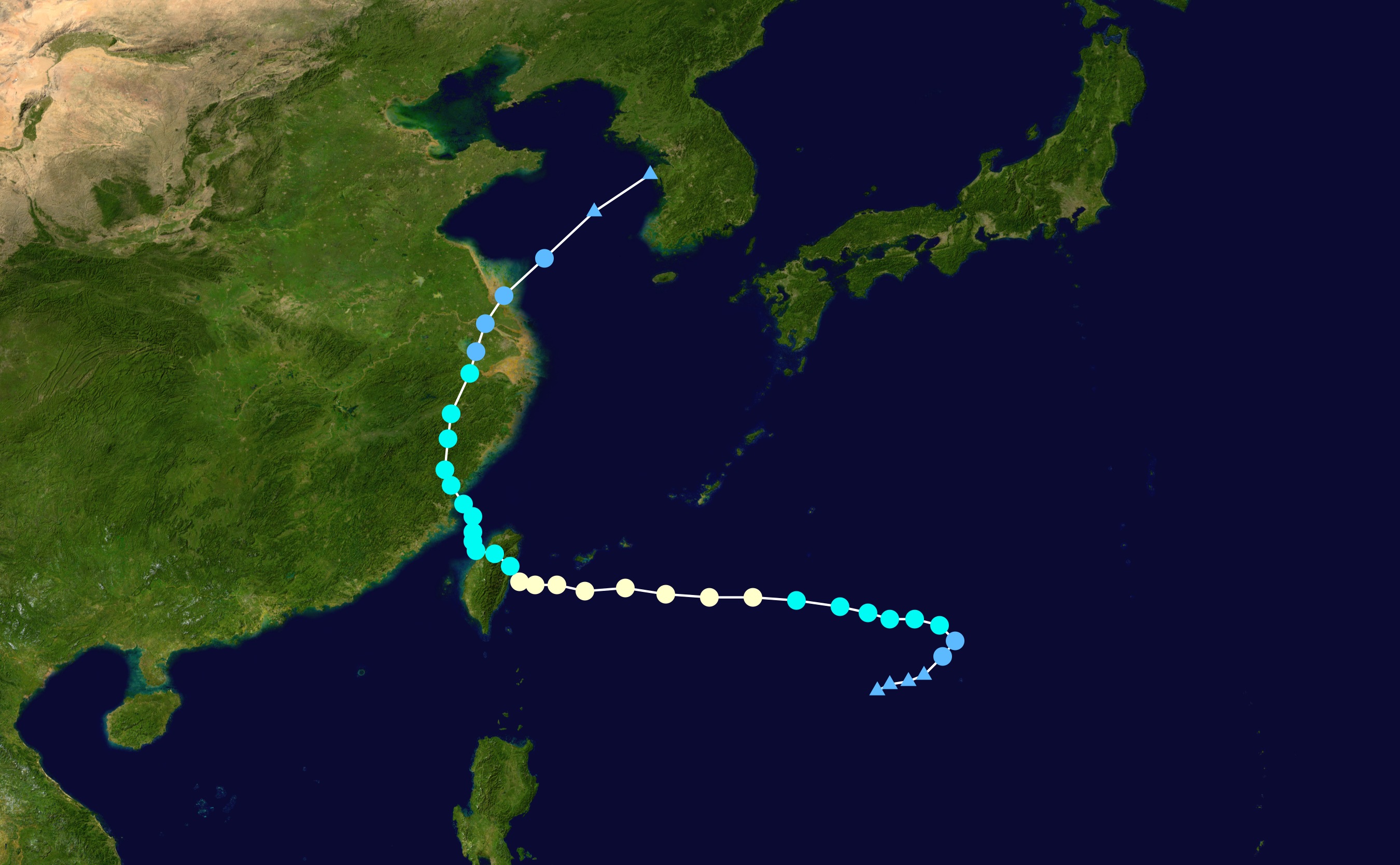
- Duration: August 2 – August 11
- Peak intensity: 140 km/h (85 mph) (10-min); 945 hPa (mbar)

The season's deadliest tropical cyclone formed early on August 2, within a monsoon trough about 1,000 km (620 mi) east of the Philippines. The depression remained weak, however, and later that day the JMA downgraded it to an area of convection. Still later that day, the JMA reported that the tropical depression had regenerated and that deep convection was flaring on the western side of a partially exposed low-level circulation center. On August 3, PAGASA named the depression Kiko as it moved through their area of responsibility, after which (the same day) the JMA named the storm Morakot, upgrading it to a Tropical Storm. The JTWC followed suit, designating Morakot as 09W. The next day Morakot recurved, reentering PAGASA's area of responsibility.

In the Philippines, ten villages (Paudpod, San Juan, Batonloc, Carael, Tampo, Paco, San Miguel, Bining, Bangan, and Capayawan) have been submerged in 4-to-5-foot-deep (1.2 to 1.5 m) floods after the Pinatubo Dike overflowed. Joint military and police rescue teams rescued 3 Koreans and 9 Canadian nationals. About 30,000 families were affected by Morakot; eleven people are confirmed dead. Three French tourists and two Filipino guides were killed in a flashflood caused by a landslide. Thousands are trapped on rooftops or in trees awaiting helicopter rescue attempts and thousands have lost their homes. At least two have died from flooding. Landslides have claimed the lives of two children and five miners are still missing after a landslide destroyed their huts. Schools have suspended their classes in the hardest hit area, and highways have been closed due to landslides.

In Taiwan, where schools were closed ahead of the typhoon, Morakot caused landslides, severe floods, blew down trees and billboards, and stripped roofs from buildings. In a positive impact, Morakot brought much-needed rain to Taiwan, ending a months-long drought, and replenished reservoirs enough to warrant an end to water rationing. In Taiwan, 461 people were killed with 192 missing. Almost the entire southern Taiwan (Chiayi, Tainan, Kaohsiung, and Pingtung) are flooded by record-breaking heavy rain. It is estimated that rainfall in Pingtung county may reach as much as 2,500 millimeters, breaking all rainfall records of any single place in Taiwan induced by a single typhoon.

South east China has evacuated 20,000 residents. A fishing boat has capsized and search and rescue efforts have begun for nine missing fishermen. A total of 34000 watercraft sought refuge ahead of the storm.

=== Tropical Storm Etau ===
- Tropical storm (JMA)
- Tropical storm (SSHWS)
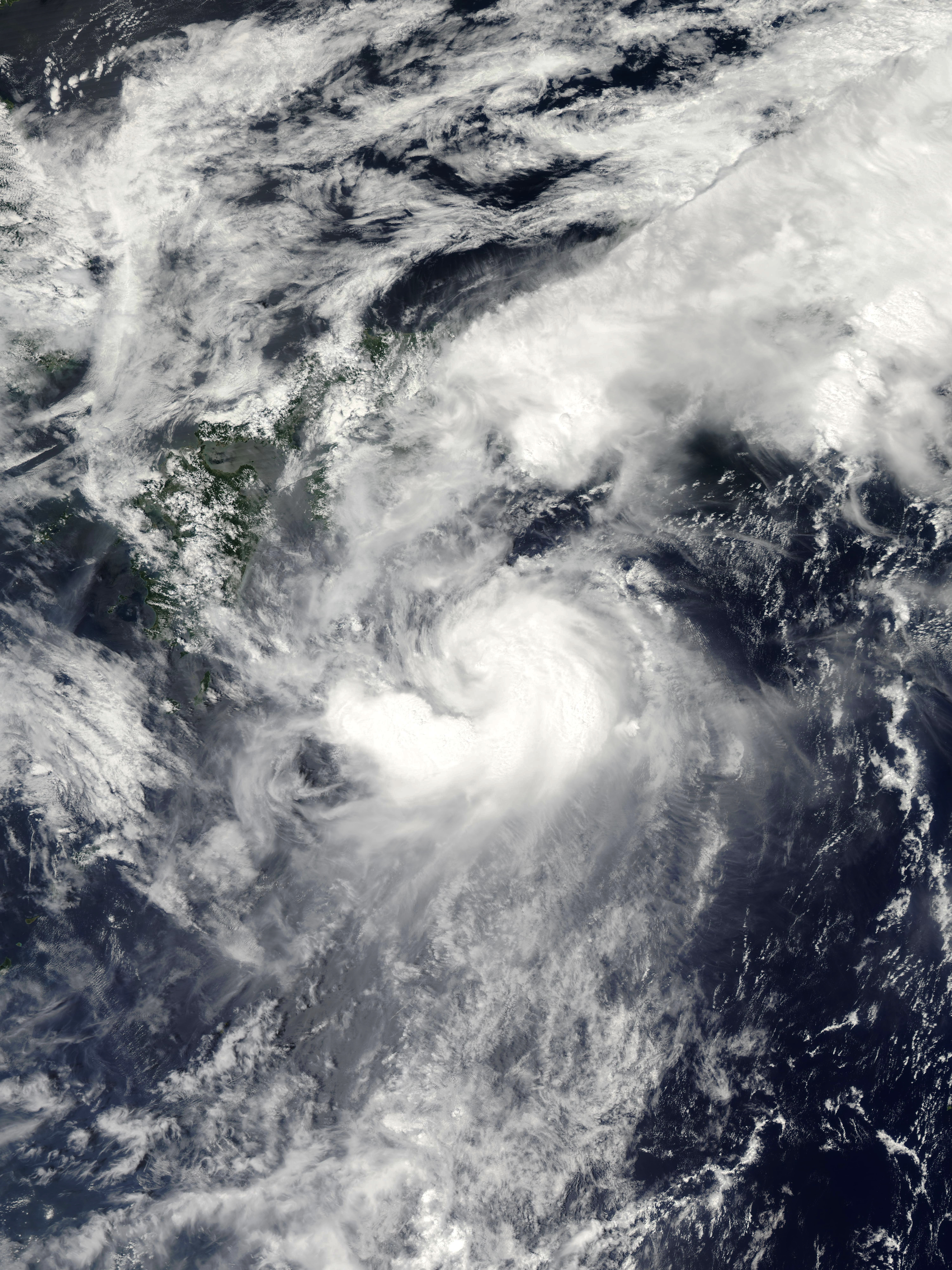
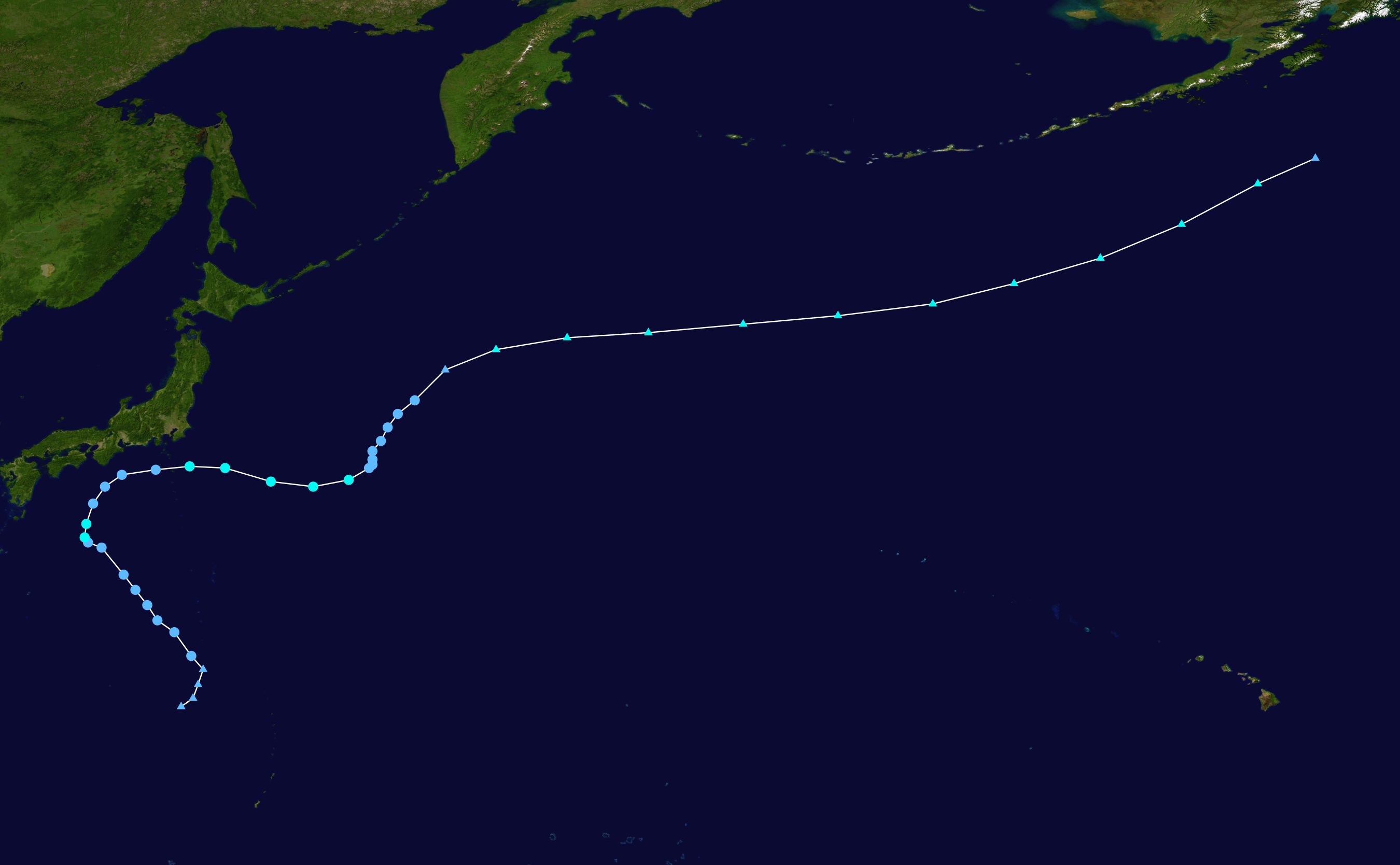
- Duration: August 8 – August 14
- Peak intensity: 75 km/h (45 mph) (10-min); 992 hPa (mbar)

On August 6, an area of convectional cloudiness associated with monsoon through was located about (620 miles) 1000 km southwest of Iwo To, Japan. Satellite imagery shows an TUTT was located to the northeast of the system. and the system is also located under high vertical wind shear and favorable environment. Late of August 7, JTWC upgraded the system and issued a TCFA because LLCC is partially exposed. while JMA also upgraded the system as a minor tropical depression. On the next day, both JMA and JTWC classifies the minor tropical depression as a full depression. On August 8, JMA upgraded the system as a tropical storm and assigned the name Etau. The JTWC, however, did not upgrade the system to a tropical storm for several more hours. On August 10, the JTWC briefly downgraded the storm to a tropical depression. By this time, the system had re-curved to the east around the western periphery of the subtropical ridge. Etau also became slightly disorganized as it began to interact with the baroclinic zone near Japan. Early on August 11, the JMA reported that the storm winds had peaked at 95 km/h (60 mph) (10-minute sustained). In post-storm analysis, the JMA downgraded Etau to a tropical storm, with peak winds of 75 km/h (45 mph). Later that day, the storm once more became slightly disorganized due to increased wind shear; however, the JTWC reported that the storm intensified based on satellite intensity estimates and weather radar imagery from Japan. Later on August 11, the center of Etau became partially devoid of convection, with only a narrow band of shower and thunderstorm activity persisting to the southeast of the center. Increasing wind shear prevented convection from redeveloping and the storm continued to weaken. Early the following day, the JTWC issued their final advisory on Etau as they reported it had weakened to a tropical depression well to the east of Japan. Roughly 24 hours later, the JMA also downgraded the system to a tropical depression. The final advisory on Etau was issued by the JMA early on August 14 as it slowly tracked northward.

Although Etau did not make landfall, the outer bands of the storm produced torrential rainfall in Japan, peaking at 326.5 mm (12.85 in). These rains triggered deadly flooding and mudslides, especially in Hyōgo Prefecture. 28 people were killed by the storm and ¥7.1 billion (US$87.5 million) in damage occurred throughout the affected region. According to the Fire and Disaster Management Agency, a total of 5,602 homes were flooded and 183 were destroyed. Following the storm, 600 Japanese soldiers were deployed from Tokyo to assist in cleanup efforts.

=== Tropical Depression Maka ===
- Tropical depression (JMA)
- Tropical storm (SSHWS)
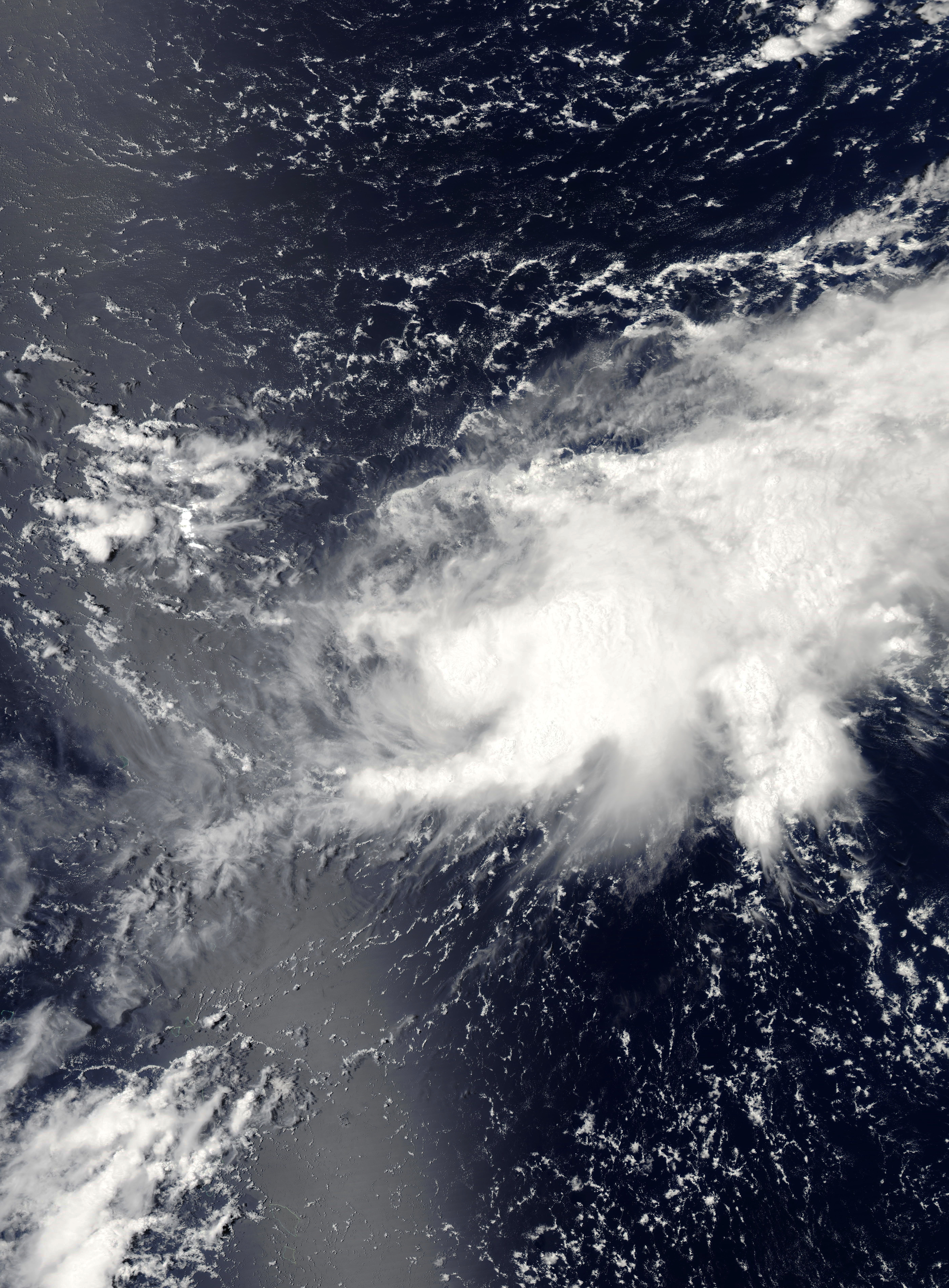
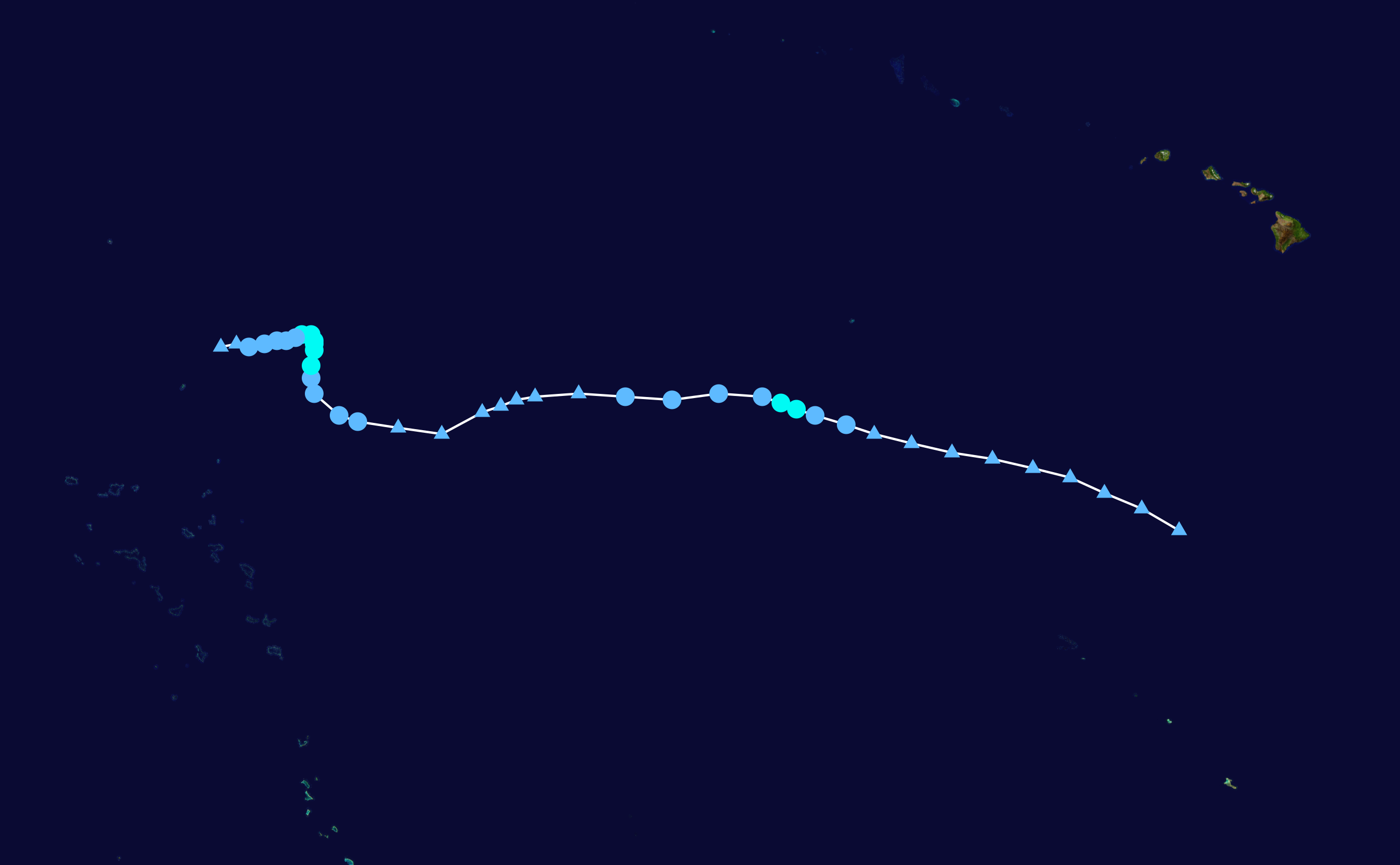
- Duration: August 13 (entered basin) – August 17
- Peak intensity: 55 km/h (35 mph) (10-min); 1006 hPa (mbar)

On August 13, the remnants of Tropical Storm Maka crossed the International Date Line and moved into the Western Pacific; where it was immediately designated as a tropical depression by the JMA. Later that day the JTWC reported that the depression was located about 1,425 km (885 mi) to the southeast of Wake Island, with deep convection developing over the northern quadrant of a stretched out, low-level circulation center which was in an area of low to moderate vertical wind shear and had a good outflow into an upper-level trough. During the next day, the JTWC issued a Tropical Cyclone Formation Alert on the depression as the low-level circulation center had developed further. Later that day, the JTWC re-upgraded the disturbance to Tropical Depression 01C (Maka). Late the next day the JTWC upgraded the depression to a tropical storm however, the JMA still classified the storm as a depression.

=== Typhoon Vamco ===
- Very strong typhoon (JMA)
- Category 4 typhoon (SSHWS)
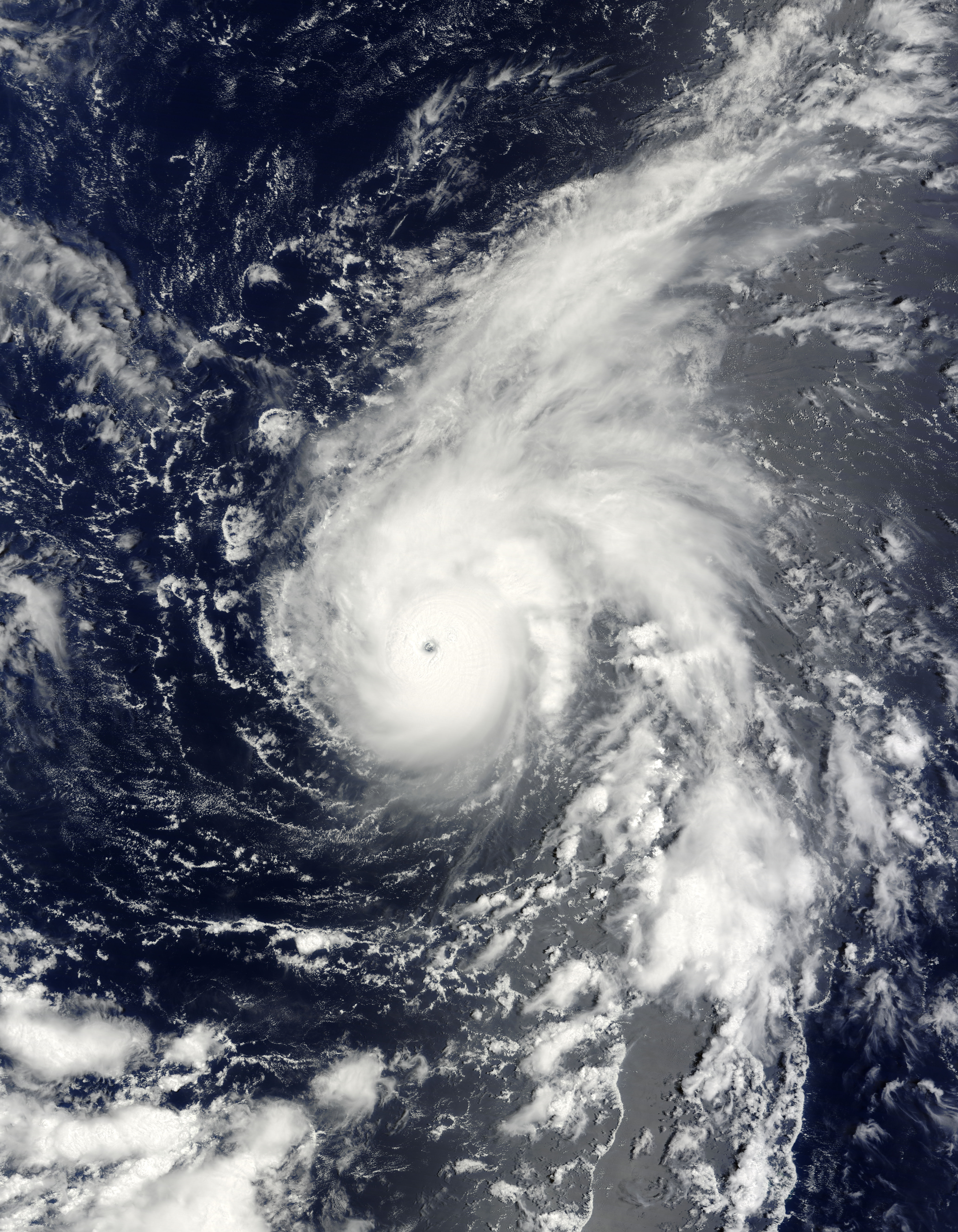
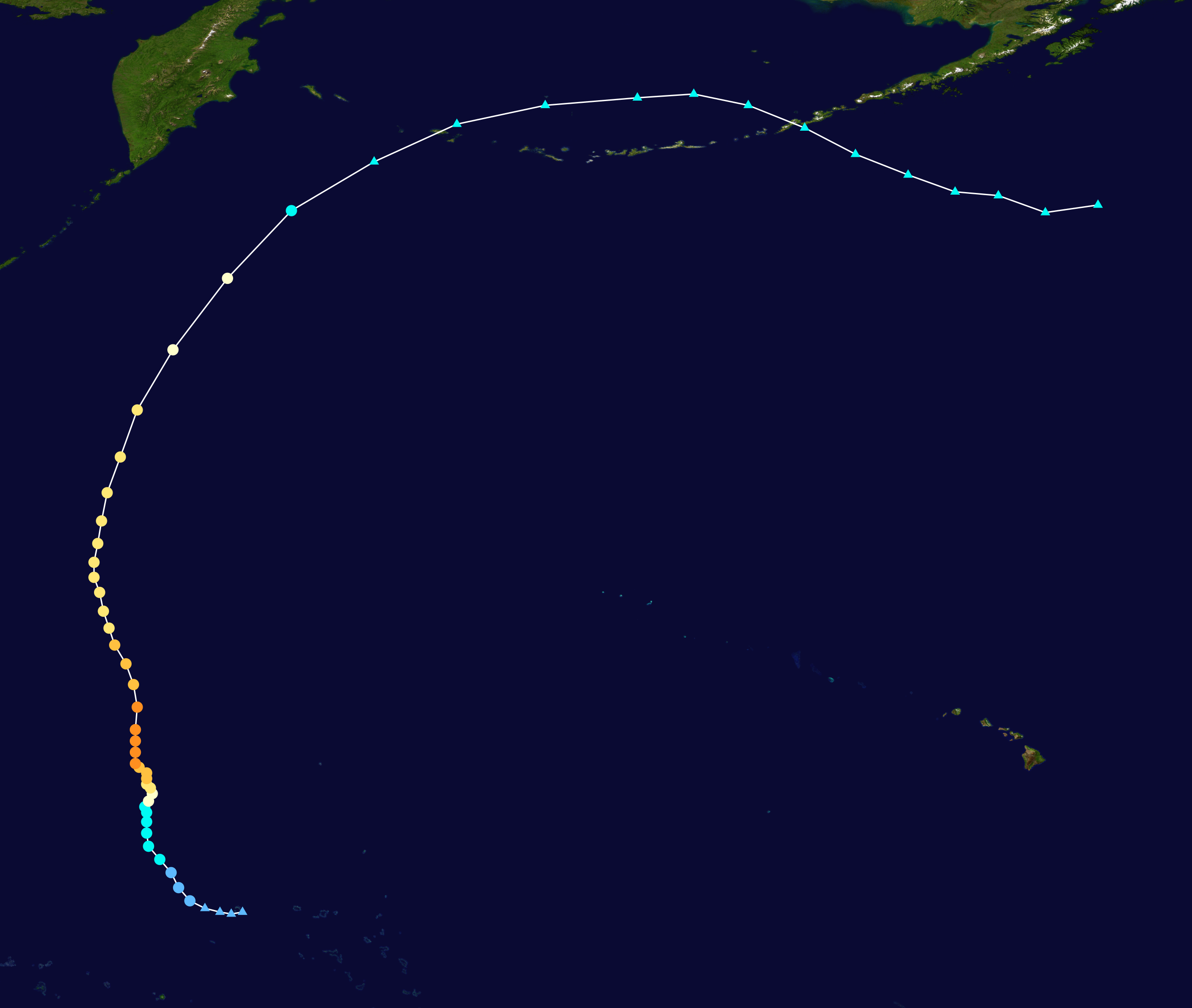
- Duration: August 16 – August 26
- Peak intensity: 165 km/h (105 mph) (10-min); 945 hPa (mbar)

On August 13, the JTWC reported that an area of deep convection had persisted in an area of low vertical wind shear about 415 km (258 mi), to the north of Kwajalein Atoll. A low-level circulation center was developing with the deep convection starting to wrap into it whilst a tropical upper tropospheric trough was providing a good outflow for the center. Over the next couple of days the convection started to consolidate before early on August 16 a TCFA was issued by the JTWC as convective bands had started to wrap into the low-level circulation center. It was then declared as a Tropical depression later that day by the JMA however the JTWC did not follow suit until early the next day when they designated the depression as 11W with convective bands wrapping into a well-defined low-level circulation center. Both the JTWC and the JMA upgraded it to a tropical storm later that day, with the JMA assigning the name Vamco to the storm.

During August 18, the JMA reported that Vamco had intensified into a severe tropical storm and was moving towards the northwest slowly before early the next day along with the JTWC reporting that it had intensified into a weak typhoon. During that day Vamco kept intensifying due to being in favorable conditions with the JMA reporting that the typhoon had reached its peak wind speeds early on August 20 of 165 km/h (103 mph) 10-min Sustained, however the JTWC reported that it had continued to intensify during August 20, and reached its 1-minute peak wind speeds of 215 km/h (134 mph) early on August 21 which made it a category four typhoon on the Saffir–Simpson hurricane scale. Vamco stayed at its peak wind speeds until early on August 22 when both the JMA and the JTWC reported that it had started to weaken, however due to the typhoon being in favorable conditions, Vamco was able to maintain its typhoon status until early on August 25, when the JTWC downgraded Vamco to an extra tropical low, and issued their final advisory. The JMA continued to monitor it as a severe tropical storm until early the next day when they downgraded it to an extratropical low as it approached the International Date Line. Vamco then crossed the International Date Line and was monitored as an extratropical low until late on August 28 when it dissipated to the south of Alaska.

=== Severe Tropical Storm Krovanh ===
- Severe tropical storm (JMA)
- Category 1 typhoon (SSHWS)
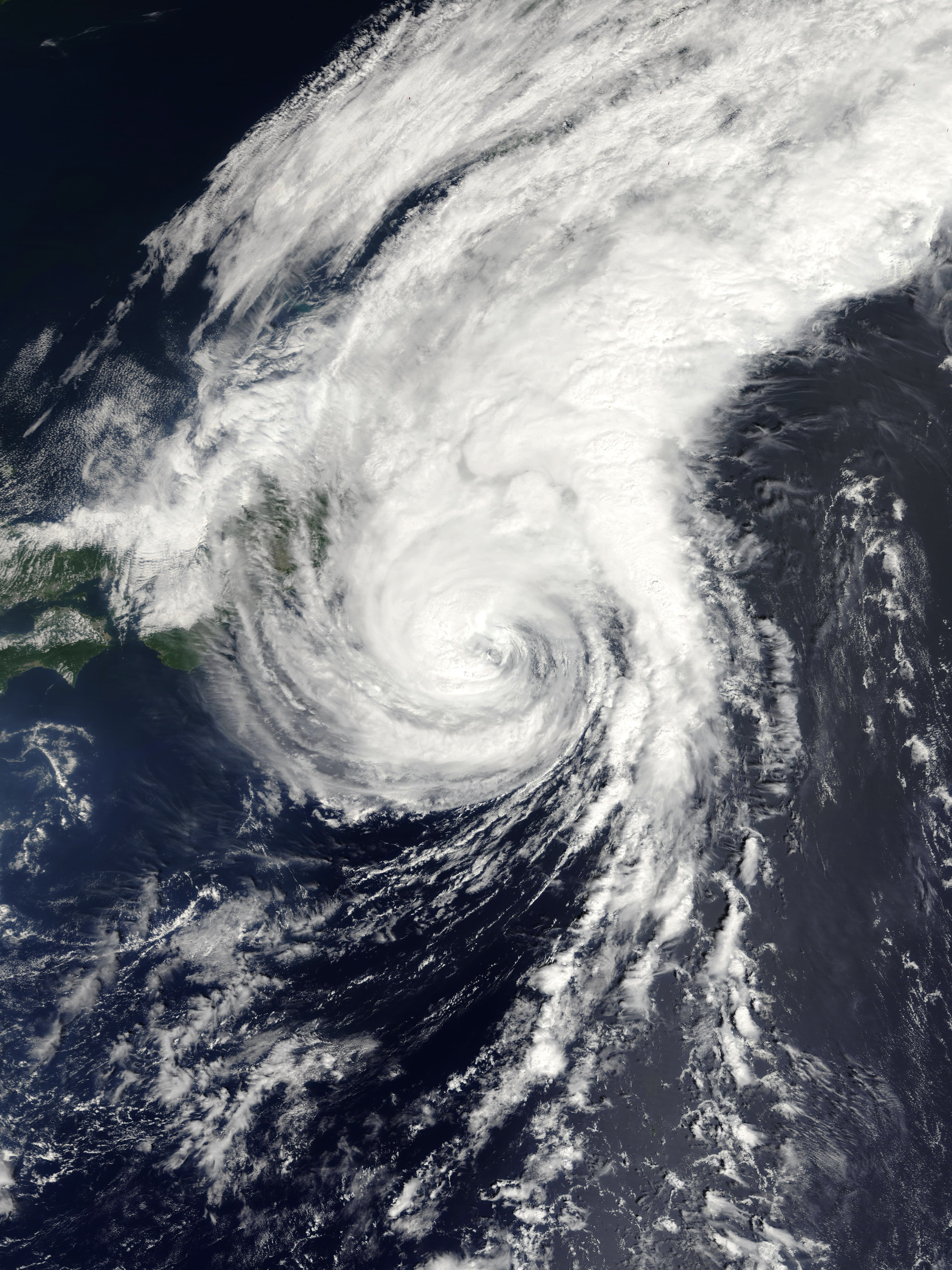
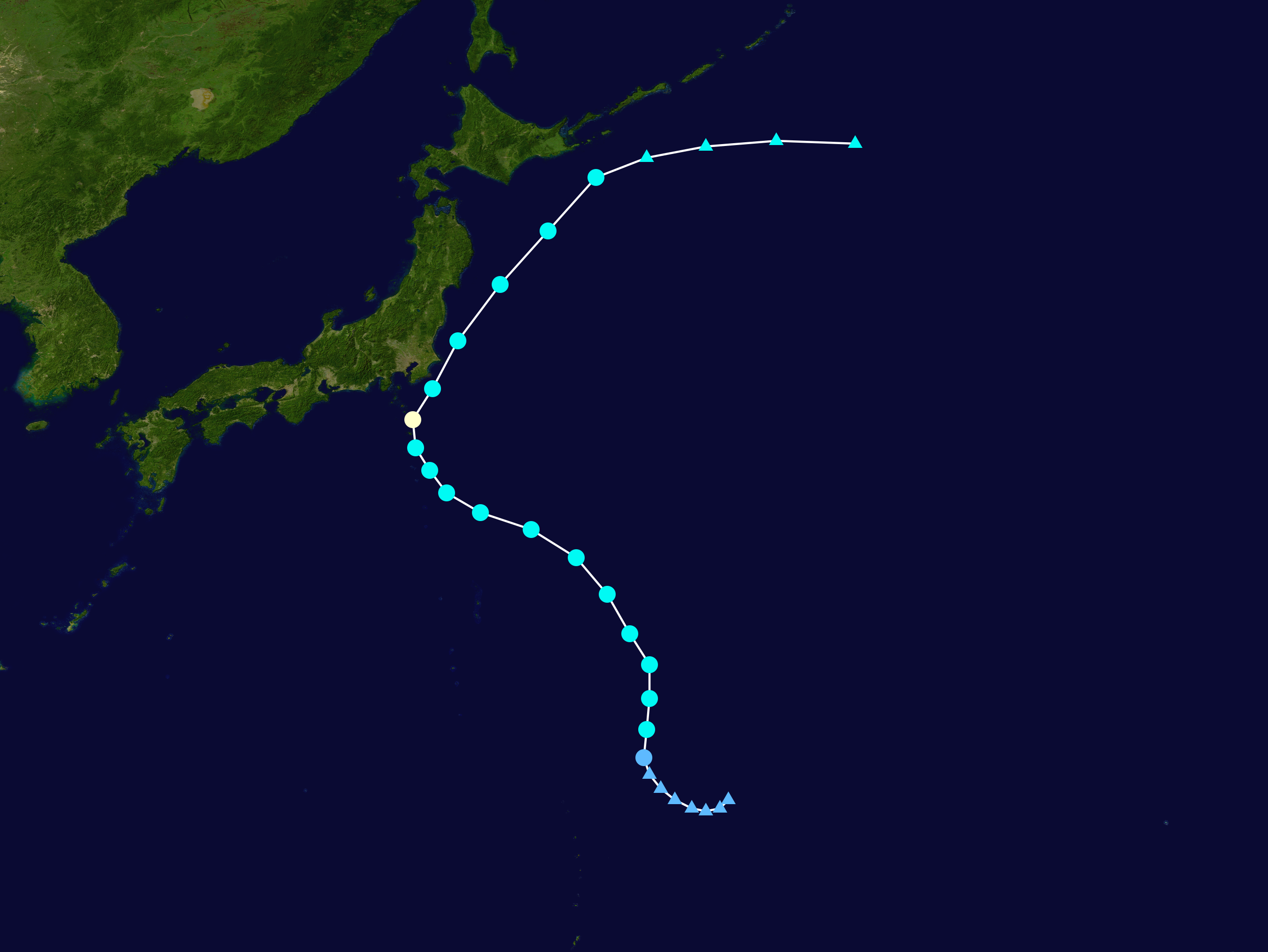
- Duration: August 28 – September 1
- Peak intensity: 110 km/h (70 mph) (10-min); 975 hPa (mbar)

On August 27, JMA reported that an area of convectional cloudiness associated with monsoon through formed about 720 km (450 mi), to the southeast of Iwo To, Japan. Satellite imagery shows that convective bands is starting to wrap into the Low-Level Circulation Centre (LLCC) and the system is located in moderate vertical windshear and favorable area. Early of August 28, the system is showing a good development LLCC then the JMA upgraded the system into a minor tropical depression. While JTWC issued a Tropical Cyclone Formation Alert (TCFA) on the system then after several hours, they upgraded it into a tropical depression. In the evening of that day, the depression rapidly intensified into a tropical storm due to hot water temperatures and associated with tropical upper tropospheric trough (TUTT) that located in the northeast of the tropical storm, whilst JMA assigned the name Krovanh. While JTWC also upgraded the depression into a tropical storm. Early of August 30, JMA upgraded Krovanh into a severe tropical storm. On the next day, Krovanh weakened into a tropical storm due to its interaction with the frontal system and the eye was quickly become visible. On September 1, both JMA and JTWC issued their final warning on Krovanh. The remnants of the storm was absorbed by a frontal system and dissipated later that day.

=== Tropical Depression 02C ===
- Tropical depression (JMA)
- Tropical depression (SSHWS)
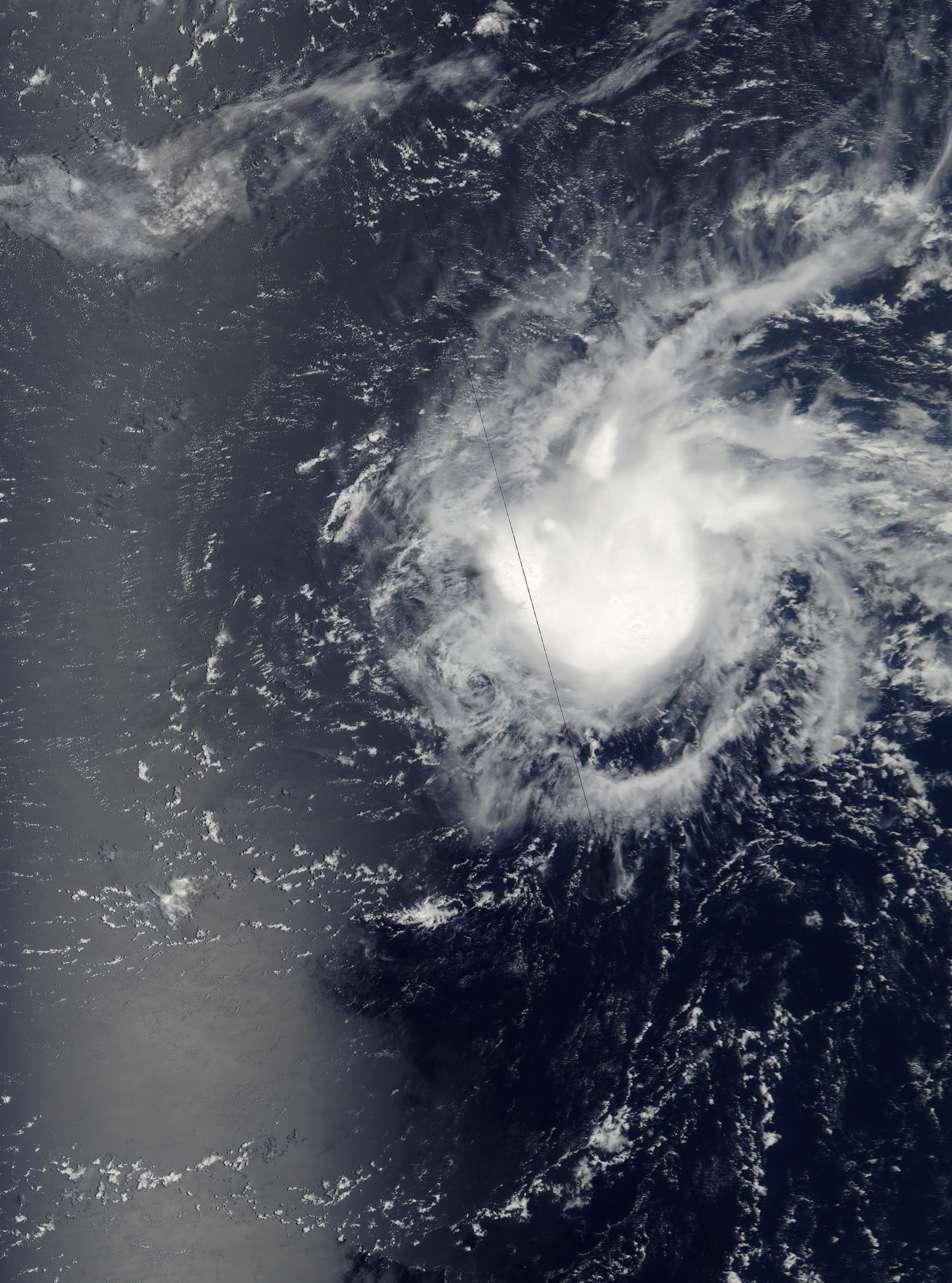
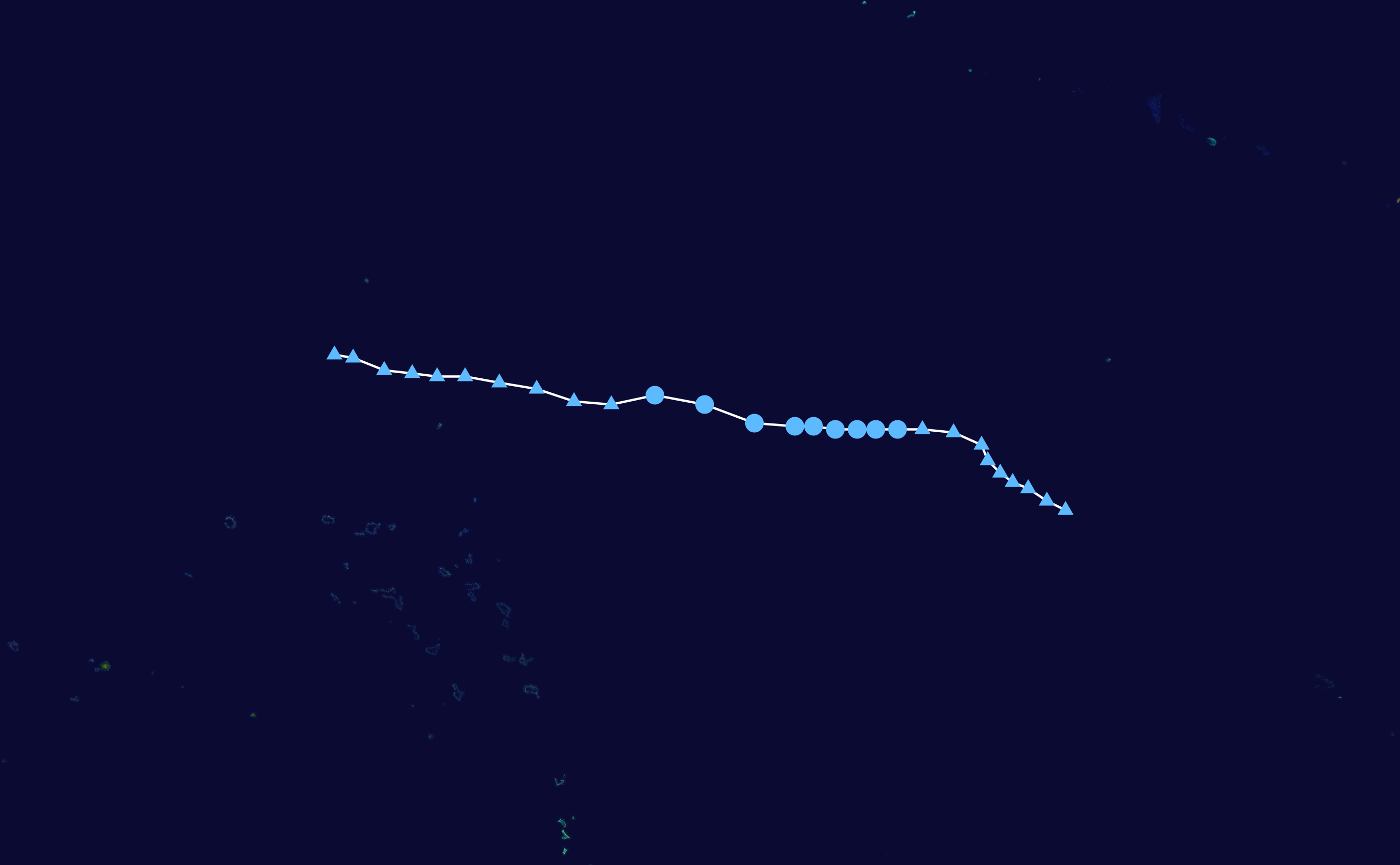
- Duration: August 30 (Entered basin) – September 2
- Peak intensity: 55 km/h (35 mph) (10-min); 1004 hPa (mbar)

Late on August 29, the JMA started to issue warnings on Tropical Depression 02C as it was expected to cross the International Date Line and move into the Western Pacific within 24 hours and intensify into a Tropical Storm. Early the next day the depression crossed the dateline into an area of strong vertical windshear. Thus the tropical depression began to weaken with the low-level circulation center becoming fully exposed and sheared as a result the JTWC issued their final advisory later that day. However, the JMA continued to issue advisories on the depression until early on September 2, they downgraded the depression to an area of low pressure and issued their final advisory.

=== Severe Tropical Storm Dujuan (Labuyo) ===
- Severe tropical storm (JMA)
- Tropical storm (SSHWS)
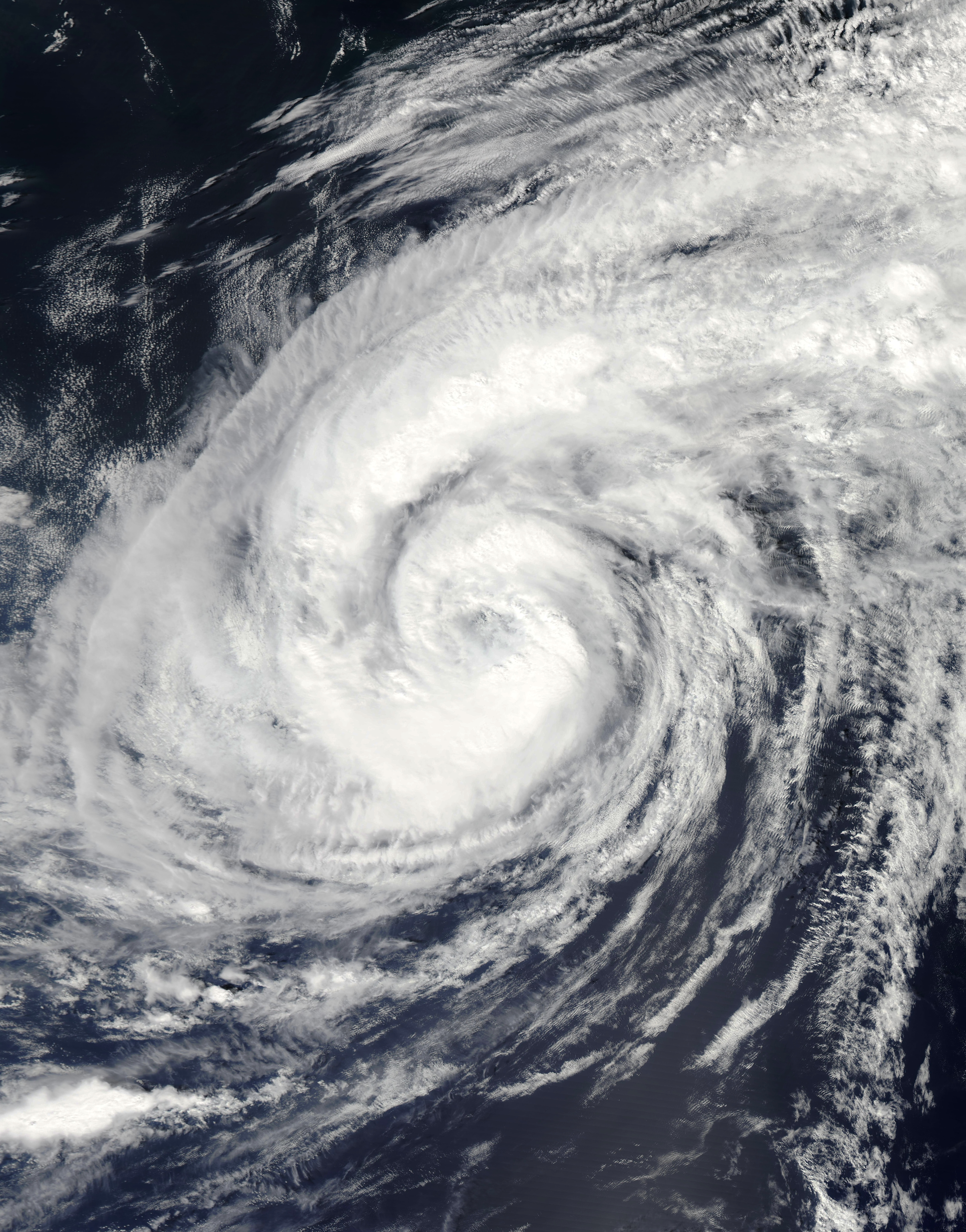
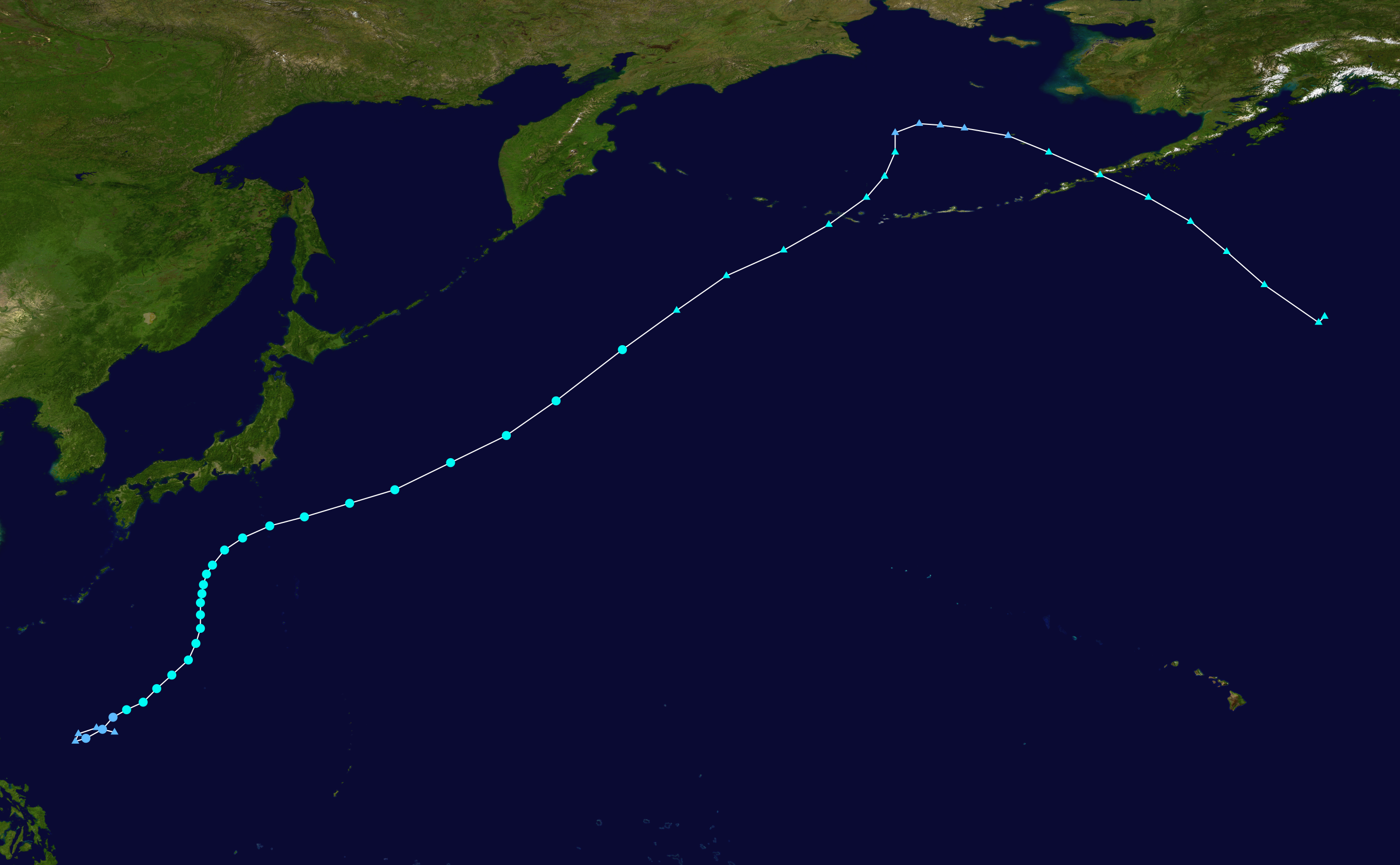
- Duration: September 1 – September 10
- Peak intensity: 95 km/h (60 mph) (10-min); 980 hPa (mbar)

On August 28, an area of convectional cloudiness associated with a monsoon trough formed about 1,000 km (620 mi) southwest of Okinawa, Japan. Satellite imagery revealed that a partial low-level circulation centre (LLCC) was exposed with an anticyclone providing good outflow that located to the northwest of the system. Early on September 1, the system showed a more defined LLCC moving through warm waters, whilst JMA upgraded the system to a tropical depression. On September 2, the depression entered the Philippine area of responsibility and PAGASA assigned it a local name Labuyo. On the next day, PAGASA upgraded Labuyo into a tropical storm while JTWC issued a TCFA. Later that day, JTWC designated it as tropical depression 13W. Early the next day, JMA upgraded the depression intensified into a tropical storm and assigned it an international name Dujuan, while JTWC then also upgraded Dujuan as a tropical storm. On September 5, JMA upgraded Dujuan into a severe tropical storm. Later that day, PAGASA issued their final warning on Labuyo as the storm moved out of their area of responsibility. Early of September 8, JTWC downgraded Dujuan into a tropical depression. After several hours of that same day, JTWC amended an issue that Dujuan was intensified again into a tropical storm.

=== September Vietnam tropical depression ===
- Tropical depression (JMA)
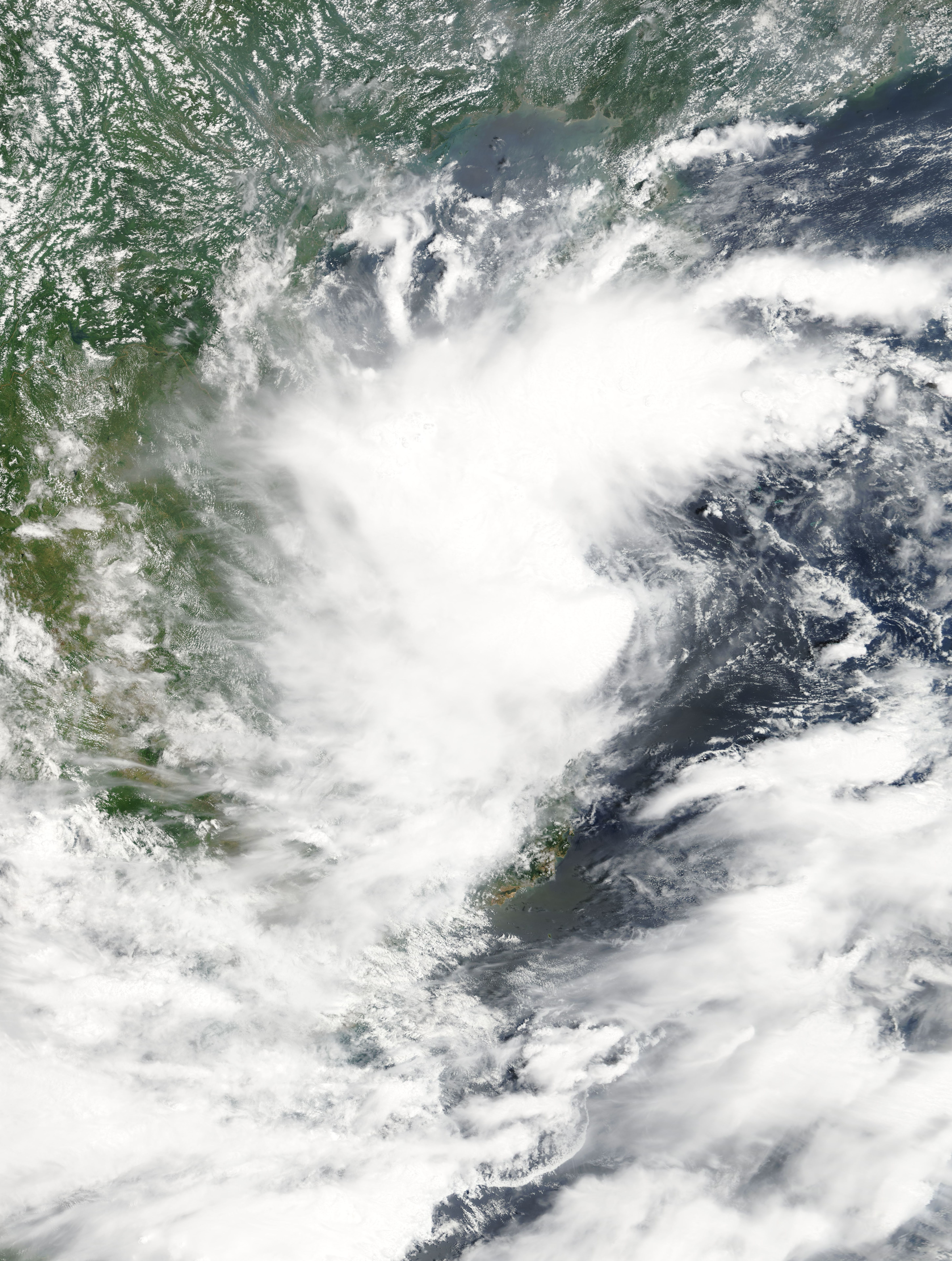
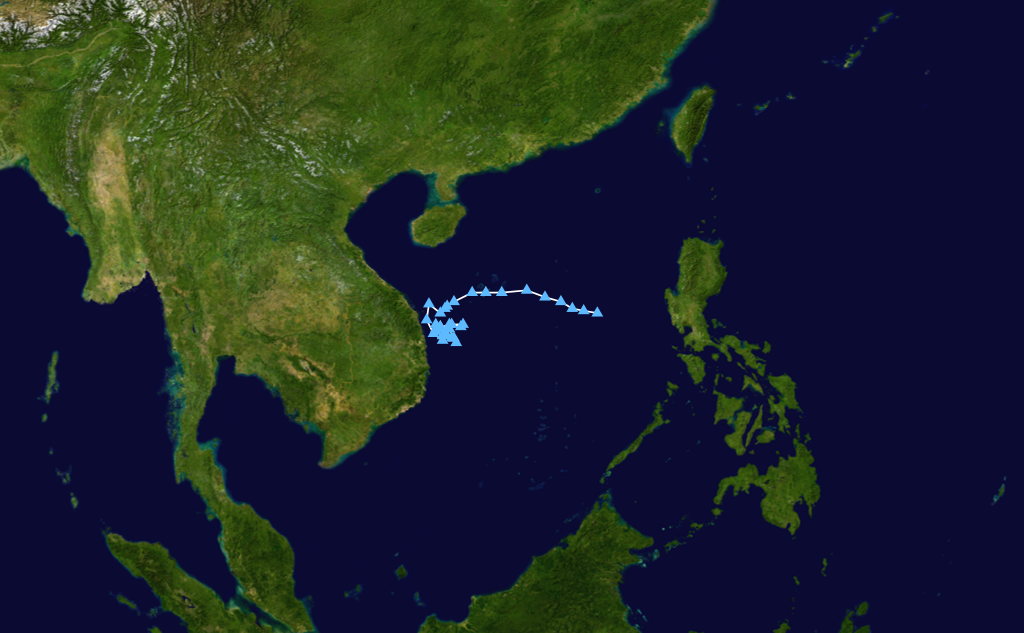
- Duration: September 3 – September 9
- Peak intensity: 55 km/h (35 mph) (10-min); 1000 hPa (mbar)

Early on September 1, the JTWC reported that an area of convectional cloudiness had persisted in an area of low pressure vertical windshear about 500 km (310 mi) to the northwest of Manila in the Philippines. The system had a fully exposed low-level circulation center with small pockets of convection confined to the western edge of the cyclone. During the next couple of days the disturbance developed further with deep convection consolidating near the low-level circulation center before being designated as a tropical depression by the JMA and had a Tropical Cyclone Formation Alert issued by the JTWC early on September 3. Later the next day, it made a direct hit on Đà Nẵng, Quảng Nam and Quảng Ngãi, Vietnam and after several hours. Later that day, JTWC had cancelled TCFA. It had re-emerged back into the South China Sea and remained nearly stationary.

At least six people have been killed and five others were injured by the depression throughout Vietnam. Rainfall from the storm exceeded 430 mm (17 in), triggering widespread flash flooding. Sixty-one tons of fish were swept away during the floods and 8,700 hectares of rice were destroyed.

=== Tropical Storm Mujigae (Maring) ===
- Tropical storm (JMA)
- Tropical depression (SSHWS)
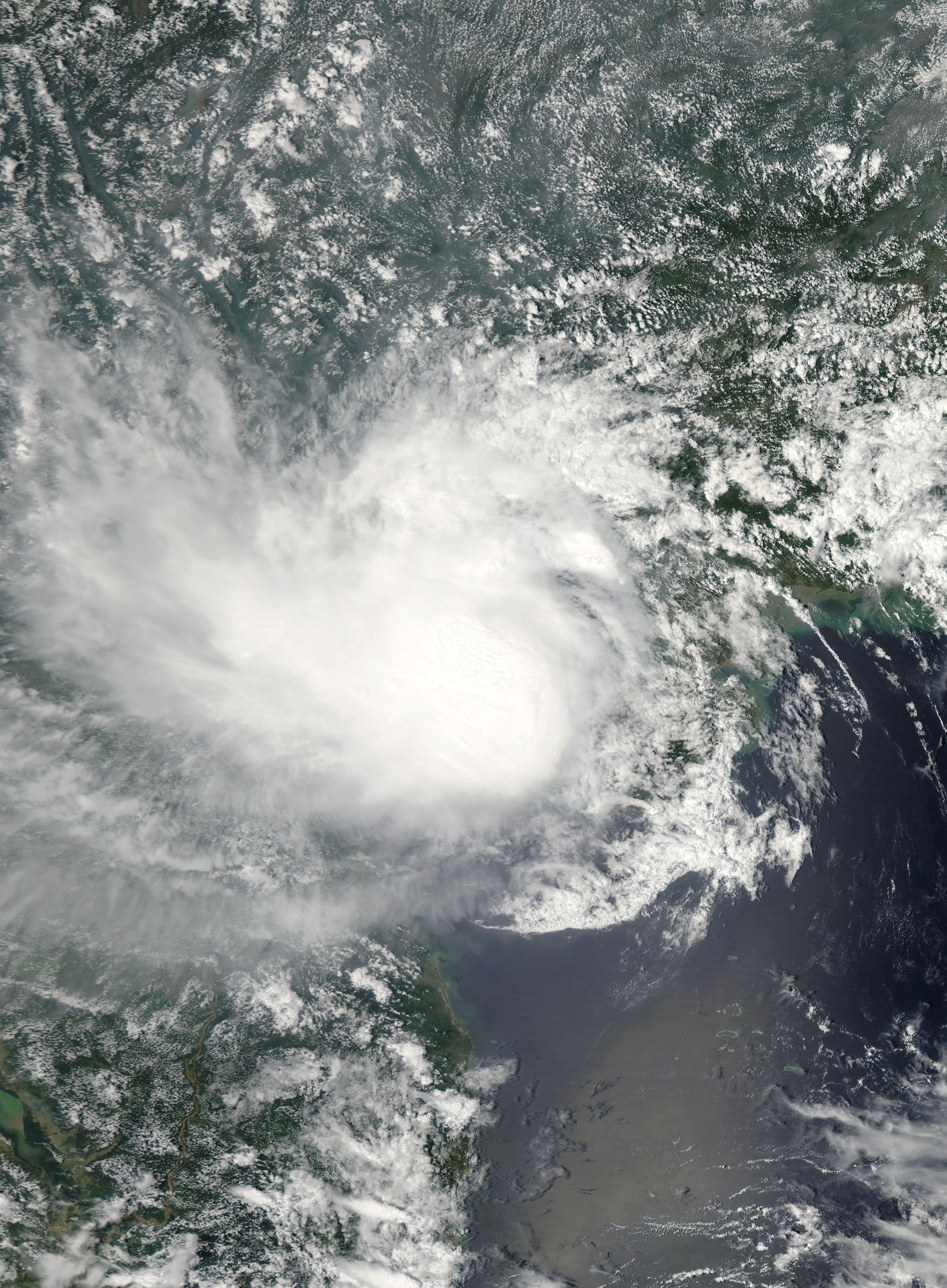
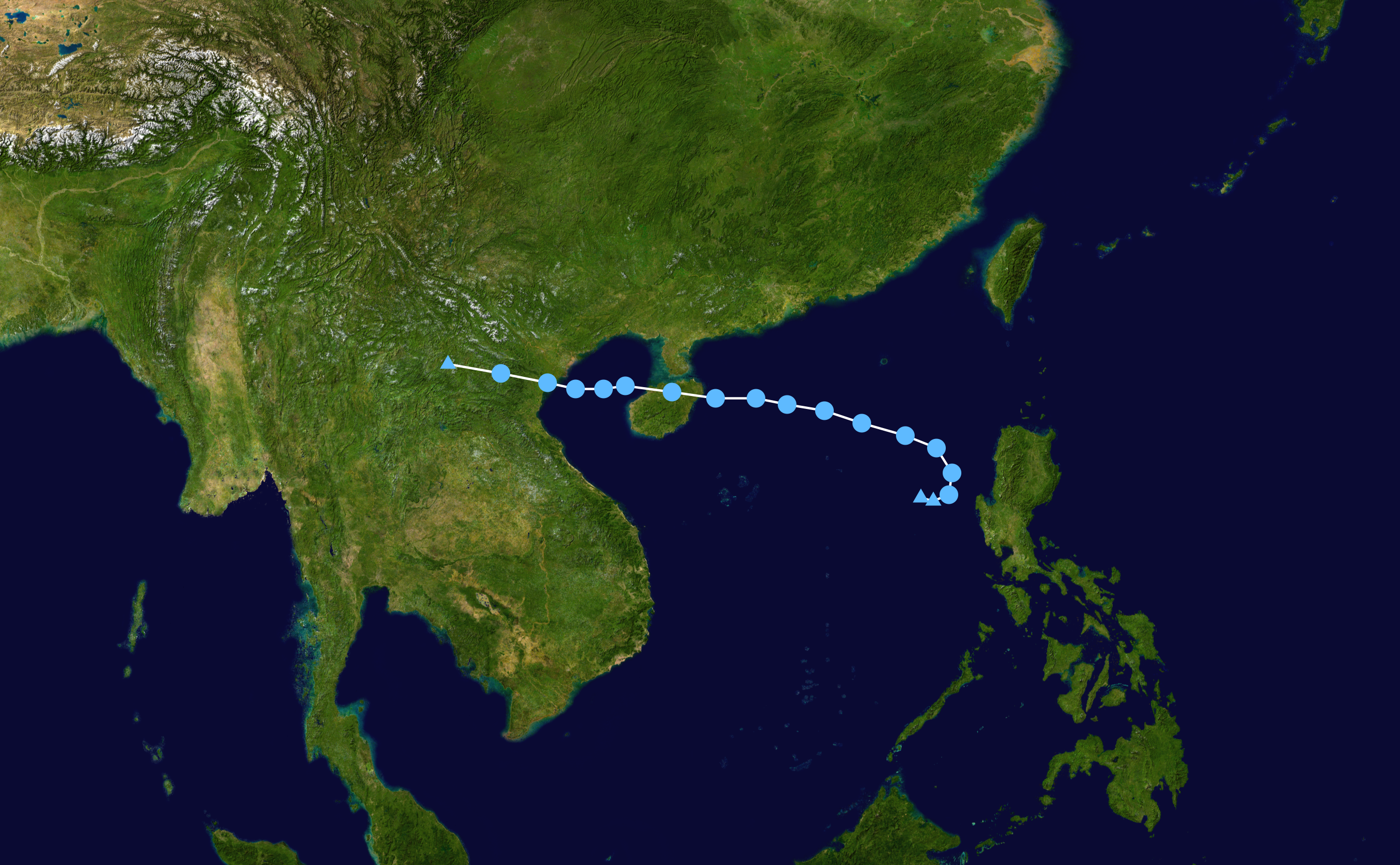
- Duration: September 8 – September 12
- Peak intensity: 75 km/h (45 mph) (10-min); 990 hPa (mbar)

On September 6, an area of convection cloudiness associated with the monsoon through was formed about 305 km (190 mi) to the northwest of Manila, Philippines. Satellite imagery shows that a mid-level convection consolidating in over a developing Low-Level Circulation Centre (LLCC). In additionally, there is a westerly wind burst that located three to five degrees of the system and located in moderate vertical wind shear. Late of September 8, the system is moving northwest and also in hot water temperatures, whilst the JMA upgraded the system into a tropical depression. Also, on the evening, PAGASA declared the system as a tropical depression and assigned its local name, Maring. While JTWC issued a Tropical Cyclone Formation Alert (TCFA). Early of the next day, JTWC upgraded the system into a tropical depression due to its LLCC is partially exposed. In the evening, as the tropical depression moved northwestward, PAGASA issued its final advisory as Maring moved out of their area of responsibility.

During the impact of Tropical Storm Mujigae in Vietnam, a weather station on Bạch Long Vĩ Island recorded the lowest atmospheric pressure value of 994.6 hPa. Overall, the wind recorded in Vietnam was not strong.

=== Typhoon Choi-wan ===
- Violent typhoon (JMA)
- Category 5 super typhoon (SSHWS)
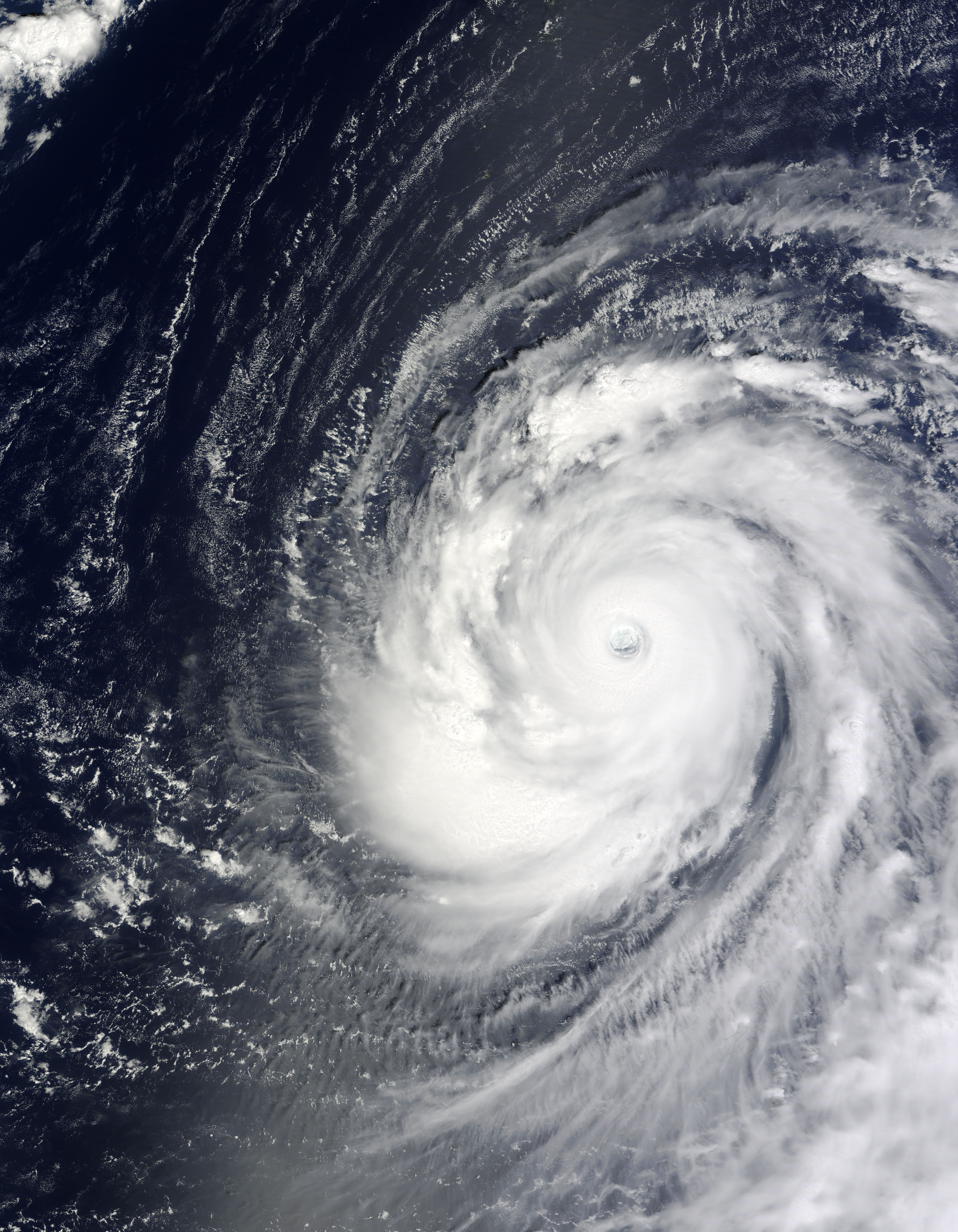
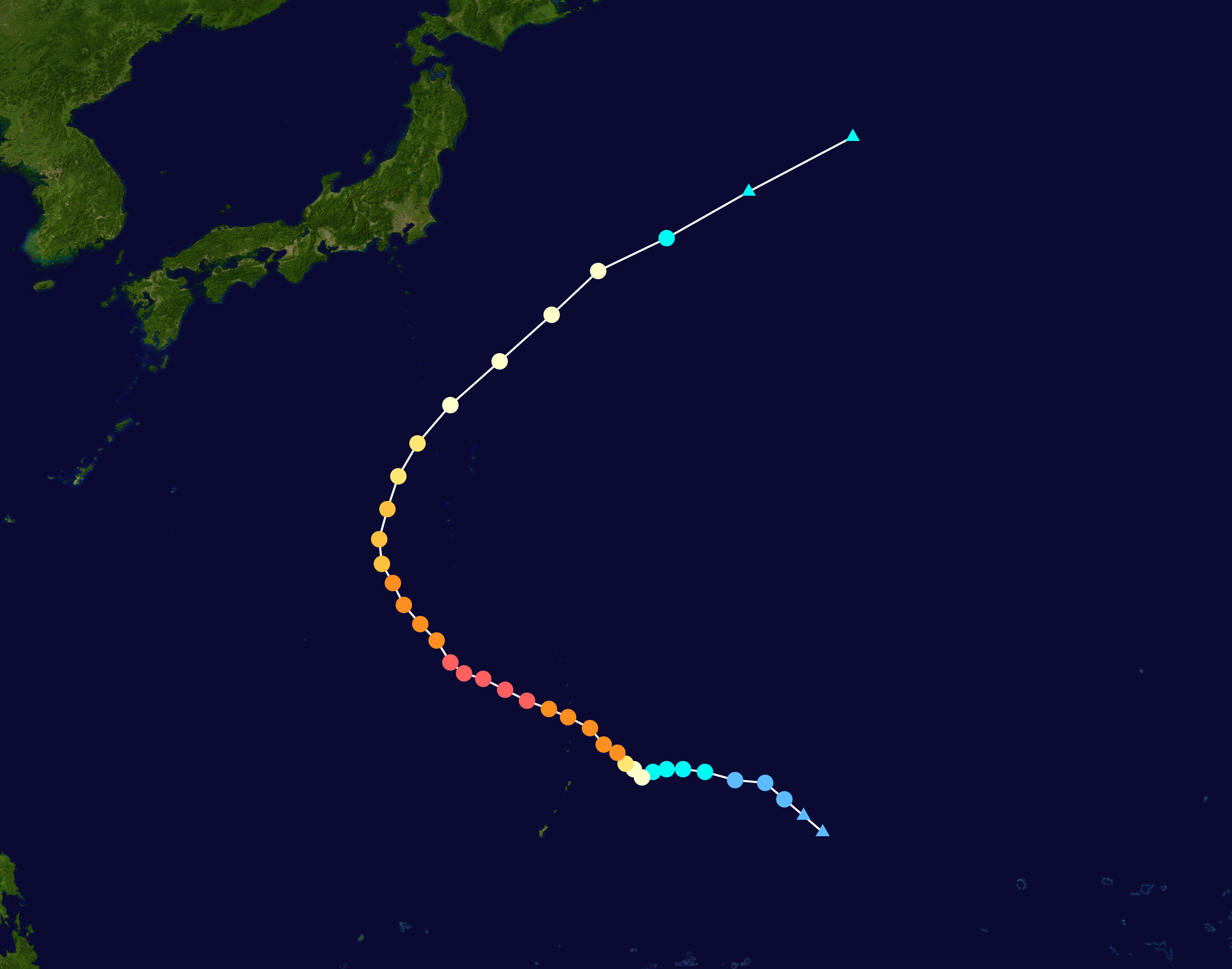
- Duration: September 12 – September 20
- Peak intensity: 195 km/h (120 mph) (10-min); 915 hPa (mbar)

Typhoon Choi-wan formed as weak tropical disturbance early on September 11, 2009, about 1,100 kilometers (680 mi) to the east of Guam. During that day the disturbance rapidly developed and was designated as a tropical depression early the next day by both the JMA and the JTWC before intensifying further and being named as Tropical Storm Choi-wan on September 12. During September 13, Choi-wan's rapid intensification slowed down barely intensifying into a severe tropical storm, before early the next day it was upgraded to a typhoon and rapidly intensified during the day to become a Category 4-equivalent typhoon. Choi-wan then intensified further during September 15, as it moved through the Northern Marina Islands with the Japan Meteorological Agency reporting peak 10 minute sustained wind speeds of 195 km/h (120 mph), whilst the Joint Typhoon Warning Center reported 1-minute peak wind speeds of 260 km/h (160 mph) which made it a category 5-equivalent typhoon.

With the help of excellent poleward outflow and high ocean heat content, Choi-wan remained at its peak intensity until early on September 17 when deep convection started to erode in the northwestern quadrant as the tropical upper tropospheric trough cell to the northwest was no longer providing good outflow. Choi-wan was then downgraded to a typhoon by the JTWC as it started to undergo an eyewall replacement cycle, with the JTWC reporting a secondary peak intensity of 150 km/h (93 mph), during the next day. During September 19, Choi-wan rapidly weakened, as it moved into an unfavorable environment with higher amounts of vertical wind shear, causing the storm's deep convection to erode. As a result of this and dry latitude air wrapping into the low-level circulation center, the JTWC decided to downgrade Choi-wan to an extratropical system and issued their final advisory early the next day on September 20, before the JMA followed suit later that day. The JMA then reported that the extratropical low had dissipated completely, early on September 21.

Despite the intensity of Choi-wan when it passed over the Northern Marina Islands, there was no casualties reported. It was determined afterwards by the US Navy that the whole island of Alamagan was uninhabitable, with all but one of the structures, a facility for laboratory and research, completely destroyed and most of the islands' trees downed. As a result, it was determined that all of the residents of Alamagan and Agrihan needed to be completely evacuated to Saipan.

=== Typhoon Koppu (Nando) ===
- Typhoon (JMA)
- Category 1 typhoon (SSHWS)
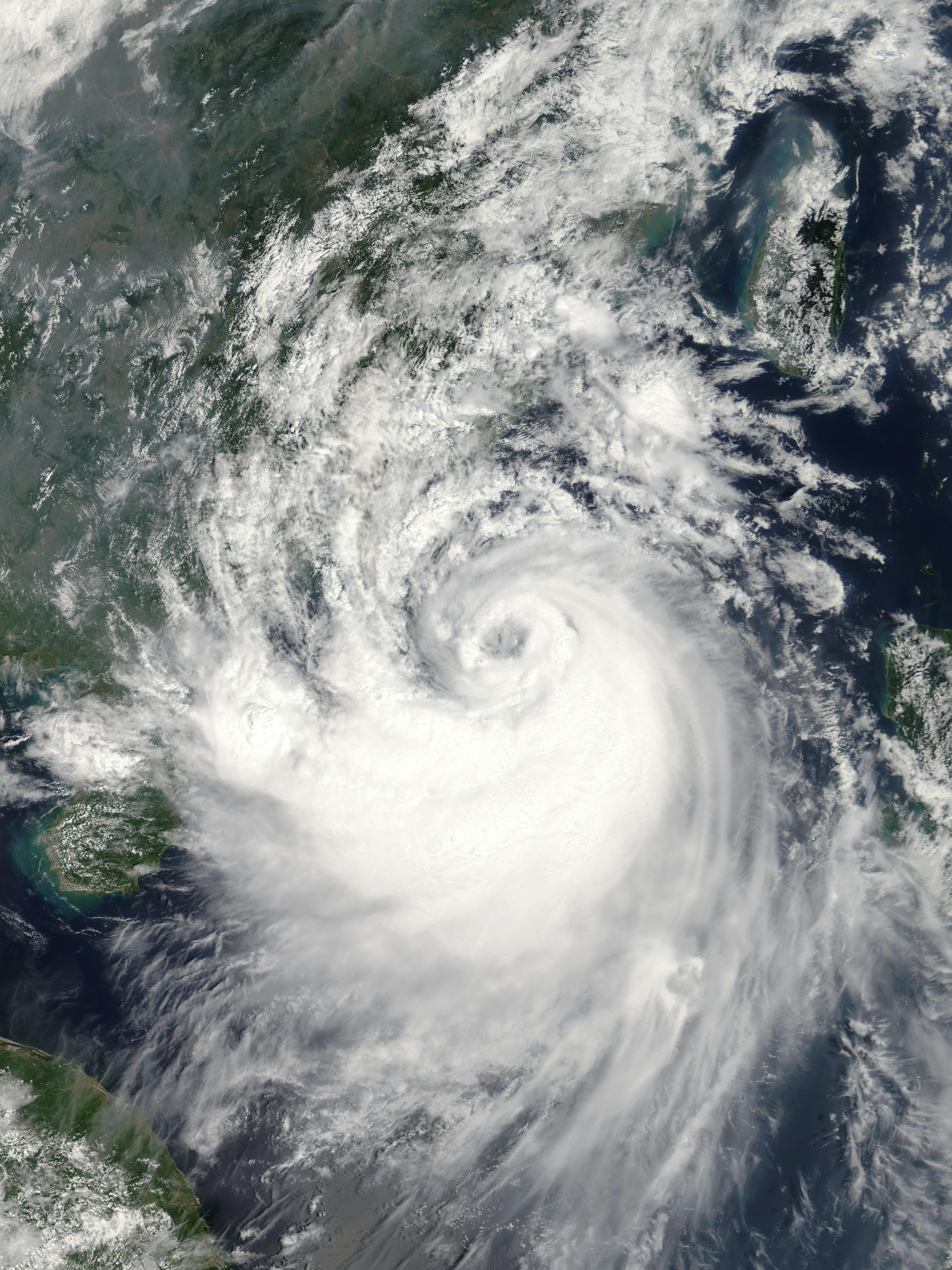
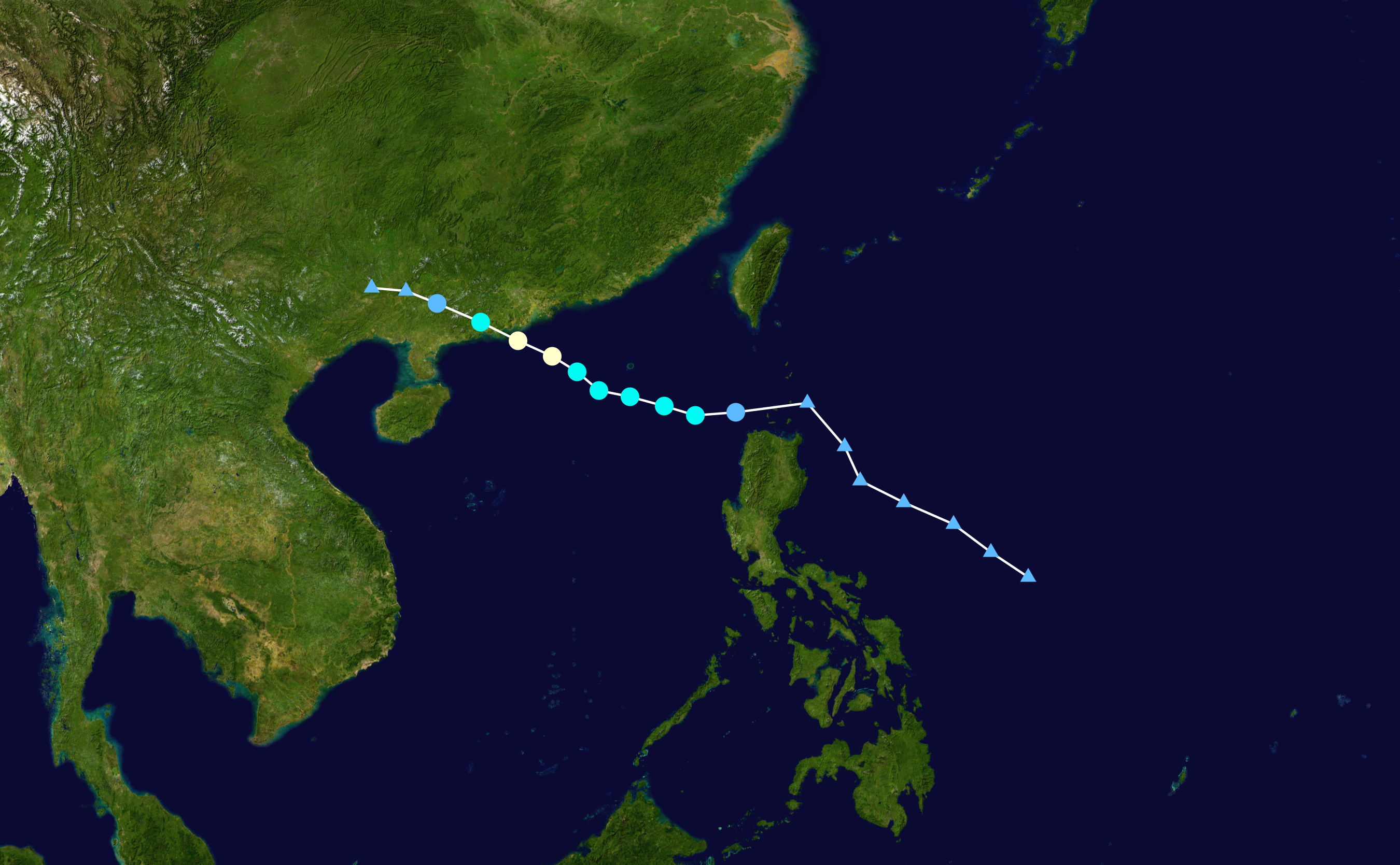
- Duration: September 12 – September 16
- Peak intensity: 120 km/h (75 mph) (10-min); 975 hPa (mbar)

On September 9, an area of convectional cloudiness associated with the monsoon trough formed 370 km (230 mi) to the northwest of Palau. Satellite imagery showed that a consolidating Low Level Circulation Centre (LLCC) with convection had started to develop and was wrapping toward the center. On September 11, the LLCC started to show improvement and was under moderate vertical shear with good westward outflow, but the JMA still upgraded the system to a minor tropical depression. Early of September 12, PAGASA upgraded the system in their responsibility and assigned its local name, Nando. At 1500 UTC, PAGASA reported that the depression made its landfall over northern Palanan, Isabela of the Philippines. However both JMA and JTWC reported that the depression did not make landfall but only crossed the Luzon strait. Early of the next day, JTWC upgraded the system into a tropical depression. Early of September 13, both JMA and JTWC upgraded the system as a tropical storm and assigned its international name, Koppu. In the afternoon, JMA reported that Koppu intensified into a severe tropical storm. On the 14th, the JMA reported that Koppu had intensified to a minimal typhoon, but the JTWC still kept Koppu as a tropical storm for the next few hours but later acknowledging the intensification and upgraded Koppu to a minimal typhoon. But the JTWC issued their final advisory early on September 15, as Koppu was moving over land, and was expected to dissipate quickly.

In Luzon, a 48-hour rainfall was experienced. In Visayas and Mindanao, a 24-hour rainfall was also experienced due to Nando's enhancing southwest monsoon. About 10 provinces were raised in signal warning no.1 from September 12 – September 13. Nando had triggered landslides resulting road closures and evacuations of some residents in Kalinga Province. The storm then caused major flood in Luoding, People's Republic of China.

=== Typhoon Ketsana (Ondoy) ===
- Typhoon (JMA)
- Category 2 typhoon (SSHWS)
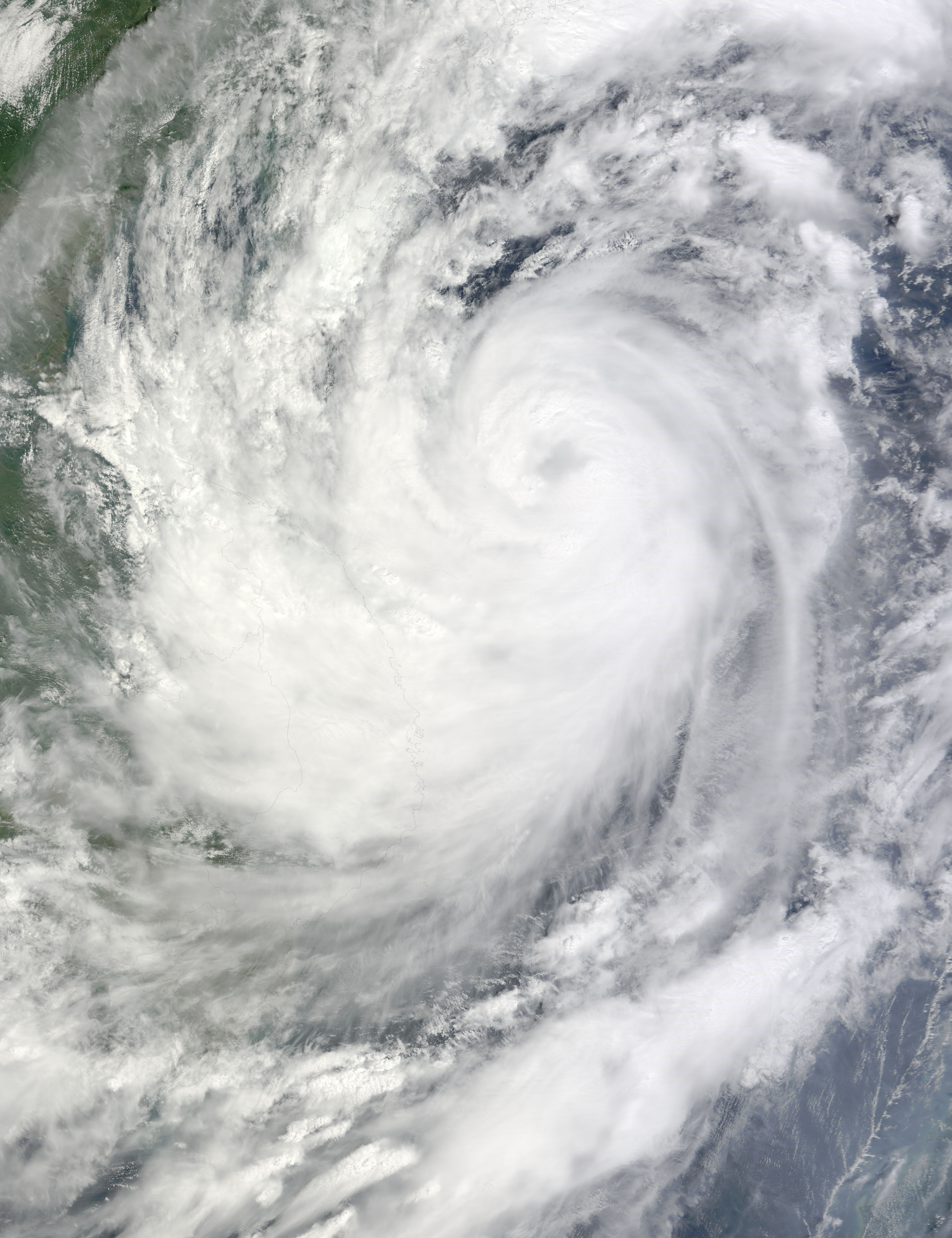
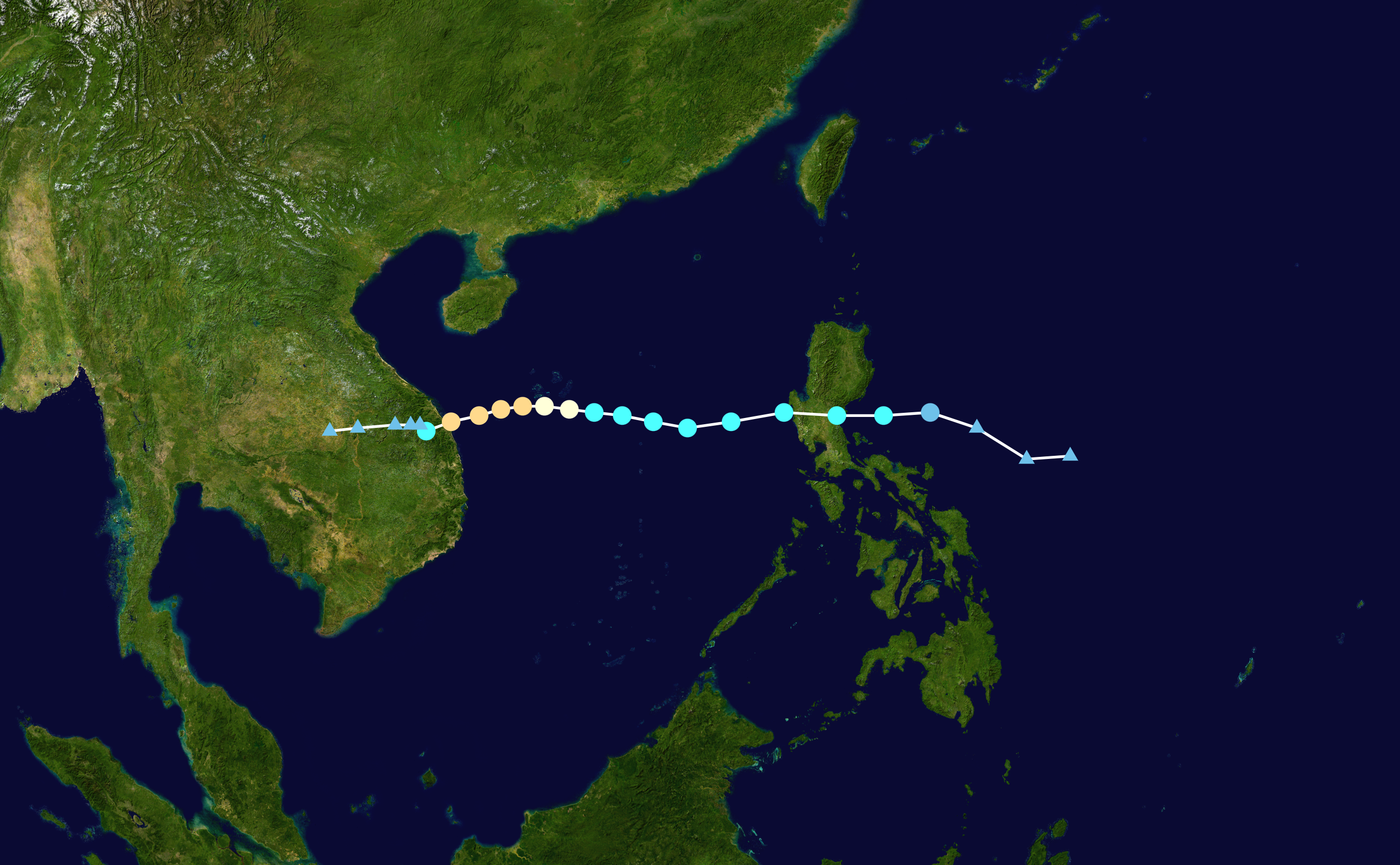
- Duration: September 25 – September 30
- Peak intensity: 130 km/h (80 mph) (10-min); 960 hPa (mbar)

On September 22, an area of convection associated with the monsoon trough had formed about 720 km (450 mi), to the east of Manila, Philippines. Satellite imagery showed deep convection starting to consolidate about an LLCC. In the afternoon of the next day, the system started showing good outflow in LLCC and was moving through moderate vertical shear whilst the JMA upgraded the system to a tropical depression. On the evening of the same day, the JMA reported that the depression weakened into an area of low pressure. In the afternoon of September 24, the JMA reported that the system was organizing again and was upgraded to a tropical depression again, while the PAGASA also upgraded the system to a tropical depression and assigned it the local name Ondoy. On the same day, the JTWC also issued a TCFA on the system. Early the next day, the JTWC upgraded the system to a tropical depression again. In the evening, the PAGASA reported that Ondoy intensified into a tropical storm. Early on September 26, the JTWC upgraded the depression to a tropical storm as well. At the same time, JMA also upgraded it as a tropical storm and assigned it the international designated name Ketsana.

In the Philippines, the whole archipelago experienced a torrential rain starting on September 23. more than 30 areas in Luzon, including Metro Manila, were placed under storm alerts as tropical storm "Ondoy" accelerated further and moved closer to Central Luzon. On Bicol region, ferry passengers were suspended during September 25 through the next day due to high waves and heavy rains that were brought by Ketsana into the region affecting about 2000 people. In the Manila International Airport, 13 flights were canceled due to Ketsana making landfall. Some universities in Manila suspended their classes due to severe flooding in some areas and heavy rainfall.

In addition, the PAGASA also advised residents living in low-lying areas and near mountain slopes in areas affected by the Southwest Monsoon and those under signals #1 and #2 (see below) are alerted against possible flashfloods and landslides. Also, PAGASA has alerted the National Disaster Coordinating Council (NDCC) for possible flashfloods and landslides in the affected areas, particularly in Laguna, Quezon, Zambales, Pampanga and Bataan provinces. Philippine Coast Guard commandant Admiral Wilfredo Tamayo also reminded owners of seacraft of a guideline barring travel for seacraft weighing 1,000 tons or less.

In Quezon City at the PAGASA Science Garden in NCR or Manila, torrential rains and 24‑hour Rainfall amounted to 455 mm the highest rainfall ever recorded in Metro Manila and belongs to the top 20 most rainiest typhoons to strike the Philippines. The amount of rainfall was 341.3 mm in just 6 hours from 8AM to 2PM on 26 September and an additional 83 mm fell for another 3 hours amounting to 424 mm in about 9 hours and the remaining 31 mm was light rain showers during the night before the epic flood and the evening of 26 September and 111 mm fell on 25 September. Bulacan also experienced an unusually high rainfall amount leading to the widespread and massive flooding in the province and overflowing of the Angat dam and opening of the floodgates at about 10:45 am.

A total of 25 provinces and Metro Manila were placed under state of calamity, with Metro Manila experiencing a record amount of rainfall in 42 years, with rain falling between 8:00 a.m. and 2:00 p.m. of September 26 pegged at 341 mm, over the record established in June 1967 at 334 mm.

=== Tropical Depression 18W ===
- Tropical depression (JMA)
- Tropical depression (SSHWS)
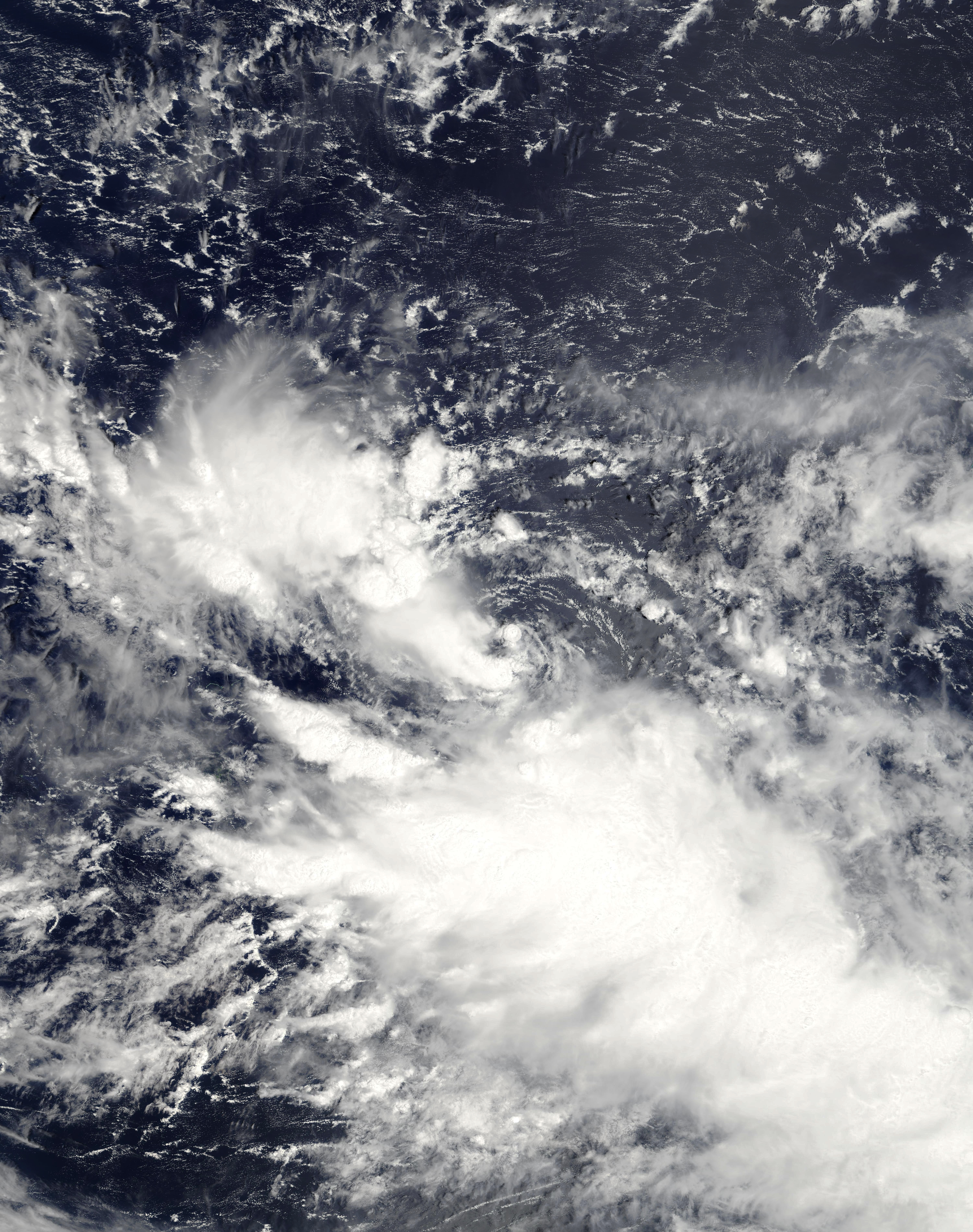
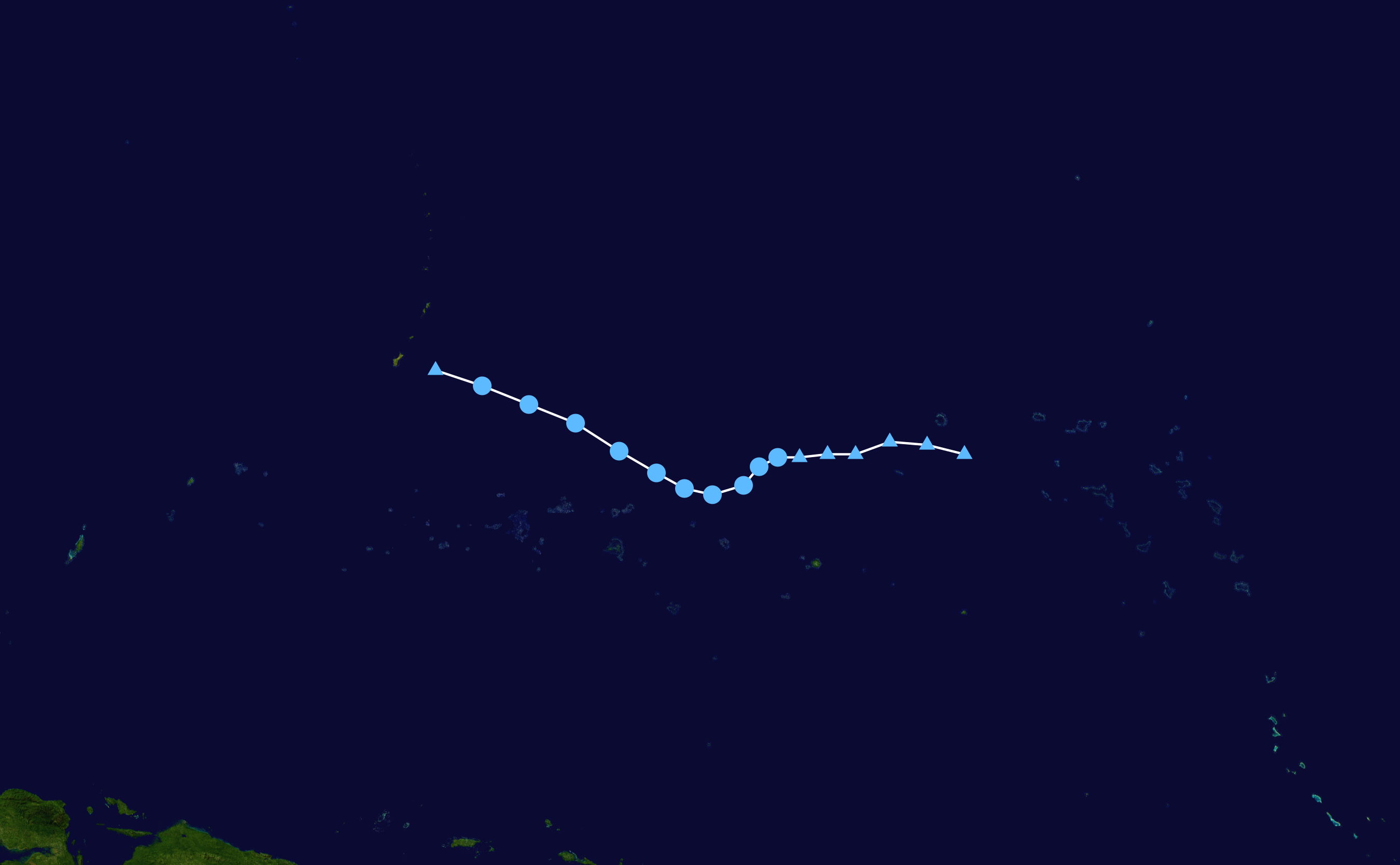
- Duration: September 26 – September 30
- Peak intensity: 55 km/h (35 mph) (10-min); 1000 hPa (mbar)

The JTWC reported on September 24 that an area of convection had persisted about 725 km (450 mi) to the northeast of Pohnpei. Deep convection had started to consolidate and wrap around the low-level circulation centre. By September 26, the system had developed strong outflow and was intensifying with the JMA reporting later that day that it had become a tropical depression however the JTWC did not follow suit until early the next day when they assigned the designation of 18W to the depression. During the next couple of days very little intensification took place as convection barely deepened around the low-level circulation center and in fact weakened due to the precursor system to Typhoon Parma was developing to the southeast of 18W. During September 29, both the JMA and the JTWC reported peak windspeeds of 55 km/h (35 mph). As 18W approached Guam, the system became severely disrupted after interaction with what were to become Typhoons Melor and Parma. As it passed near the island, the storm rapidly dissipated, first weakening to a depression and then as it lost its low-level circulation centre it was no longer considered a tropical cyclone and thus the final warnings from the JTWC and the JMA were issued.

Despite a state of emergency being declared by the Governor of Guam before the depression affected Guam on September 29, it had very little impact on Guam. With only increased winds and moderate rainfall reported. All flights in and out of Guam were cancelled until the storm had passed. Five ships and a submarine from the United States Navy moved out to sea to avoid the storm; however, one submarine was unable to leave and remained at port during the storm.

=== Typhoon Parma (Pepeng) ===
- Very strong typhoon (JMA)
- Category 4 super typhoon (SSHWS)
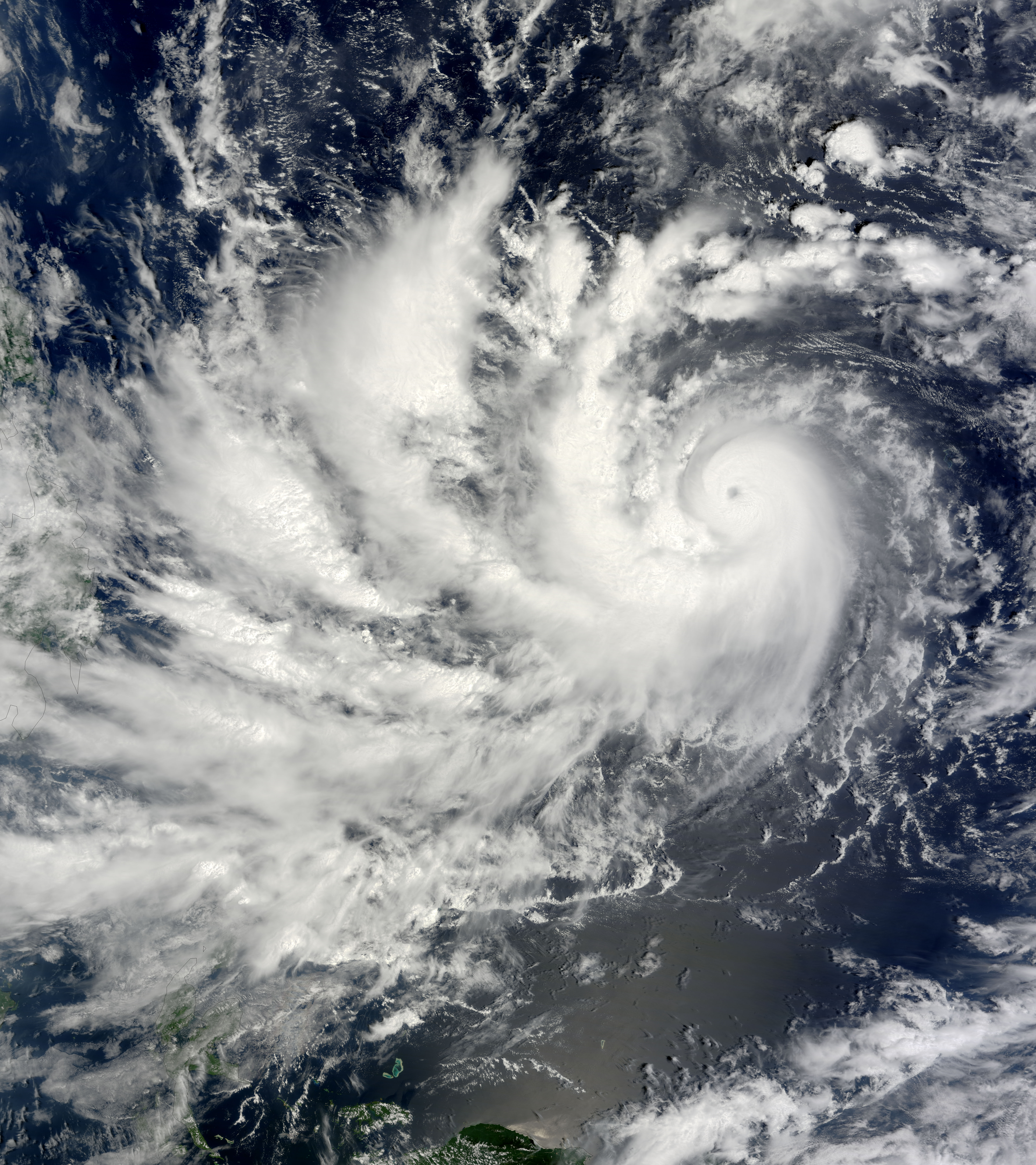
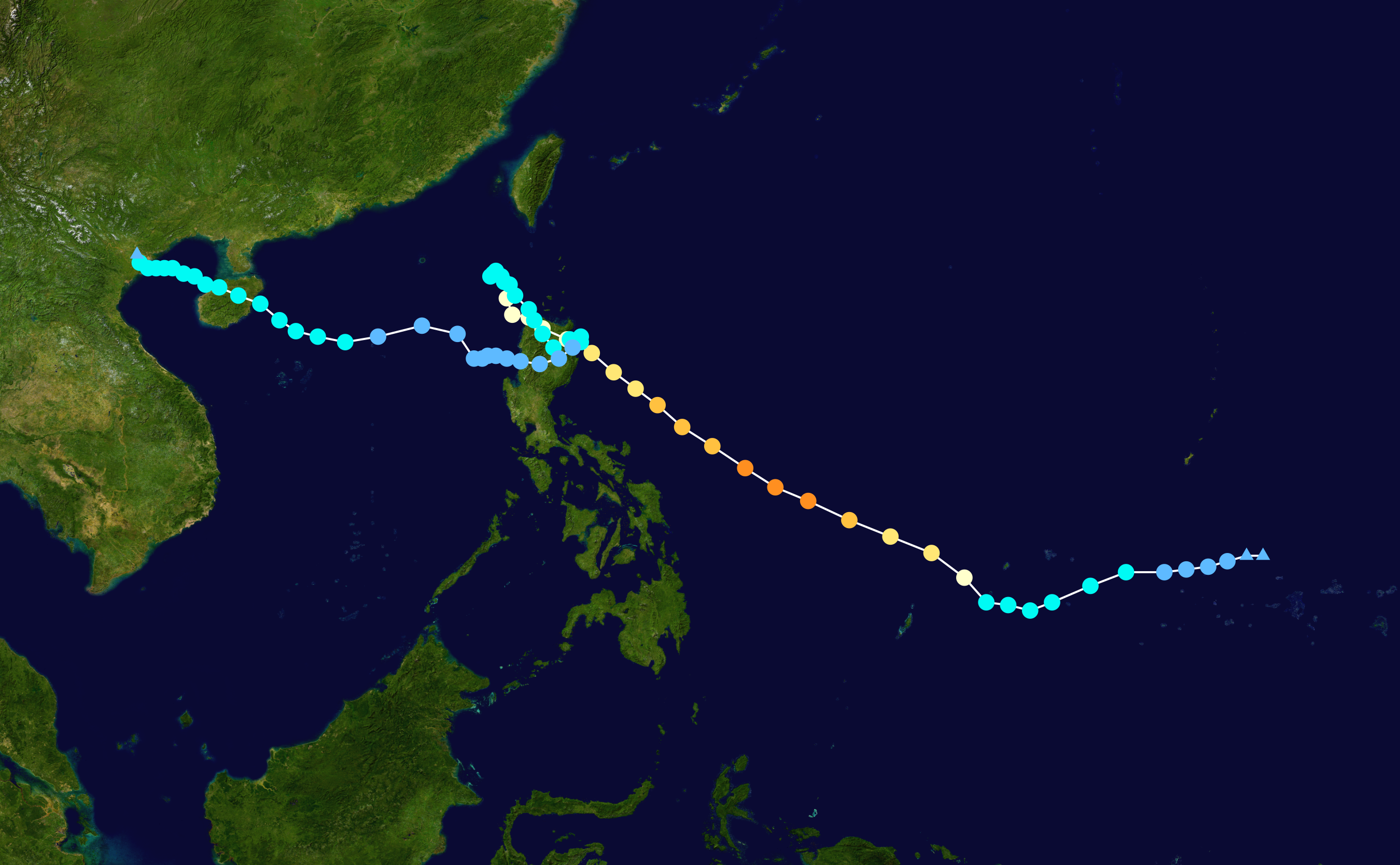
- Duration: September 27 – October 14
- Peak intensity: 185 km/h (115 mph) (10-min); 930 hPa (mbar)

Early on September 25, an area of convectional cloudiness associated with the monsoon through formed 410 km (250 mi) to the southeast of Palau. Satellite imagery showed a consolidating Low Level Circulation Centre. On September 27, the system began improving and showing a partial LLCC due to favorable conditions and was also located under moderate vertical wind shear, whilst the JMA upgraded the system into a tropical depression. On the evening of that day, the JTWC issued a Tropical Cyclone Formation Alert. On the next day, JMA reported that the depression had intensified into a tropical storm, submitting its international designated name, Parma. Also, on September 28, JTWC upgraded it to a tropical depression.

On the next day, JTWC again upgraded the depression into a tropical storm. And, by early September 30, due to the storm moving through warm water temperatures, the JTWC and JMA upgraded it to a Category 1 typhoon. Satellite imagery also began showing that an eye wall structure had formed. Intensification continued into the morning of the next day, reaching Category 3 status. Then, after four hours, Parma rapidly strengthened to a Category 4 super typhoon, reaching its peak strength. Different weather bureaus forecasted that Parma would intensify into a Category 5 super typhoon, however, it weakened in the afternoon of October 1 as the eye of Parma began to degrade due to its movement into unfavorable conditions. Parma continued to slightly weaken while moving through the area of Cagayan, then by midday of October 3, it was downgraded into a Category 3-equivalent typhoon.

Before it made landfall over northern Cagayan at 3:00 pm PST (07:00 UTC), it weakened into a Category 2 typhoon. Parma crossed northern Luzon over 12 hours, during which the typhoon weakened into a category 1 equivalent typhoon. PAGASA reported that the typhoon was moving almost stationary in their area of responsibility due to interaction with Typhoon Melor and a ridge of high-pressure area over mainland China. At the same time, JTWC downgraded Parma into a tropical storm while the JMA downgraded it into a severe tropical storm. Early the next day, satellite imagery revealed that Parma had an eye center but no convectional cloudiness due to high pressure. Intensification was unlikely because of unfavorable environment conditions and interaction with Typhoon Melor.

On October 6, at 11:00 pm PST (15:00 UTC), Parma made its second landfall over Ilocos Norte as it moved to the southeast. In the afternoon of the next day, PAGASA reported that Parma weakened into a tropical depression near the Isabela area, while both JMA and JTWC still classified Parma as a tropical storm. In the morning of October 8, it emerged back into waters near Isabela. After four hours, Parma made its third landfall in Cagayan. The next day, Parma crossed Northern Luzon for the third time. Then by the afternoon of that day, Parma exited La Union and emerged back into the South China Sea. As it moved out into the Philippine area of responsibility, then PAGASA issued their final warning on Parma.

On October 10, both JMA and JTWC reported that Parma reintensified into a tropical storm while it was over the South China Sea. Intensification was almost difficult due to moderate vertical wind shear.

Then by late of October 12, it made its fourth landfall over Hainan Island in China. Early on October 14, Parma was downgraded by JMA to a tropical depression because there was a lack of convection. Then by the afternoon of that day, it made its fifth landfall over the coastline of Vietnam. In the evening, JMA reported that Parma weakened into an area of low pressure, becoming the agency issues their final advisory. However, JTWC still considered Parma as a tropical storm.

The names Parma and Pepeng were retired at the end of the season.

At least 500 people were killed by Parma.

=== Typhoon Melor (Quedan) ===
- Violent typhoon (JMA)
- Category 5 super typhoon (SSHWS)
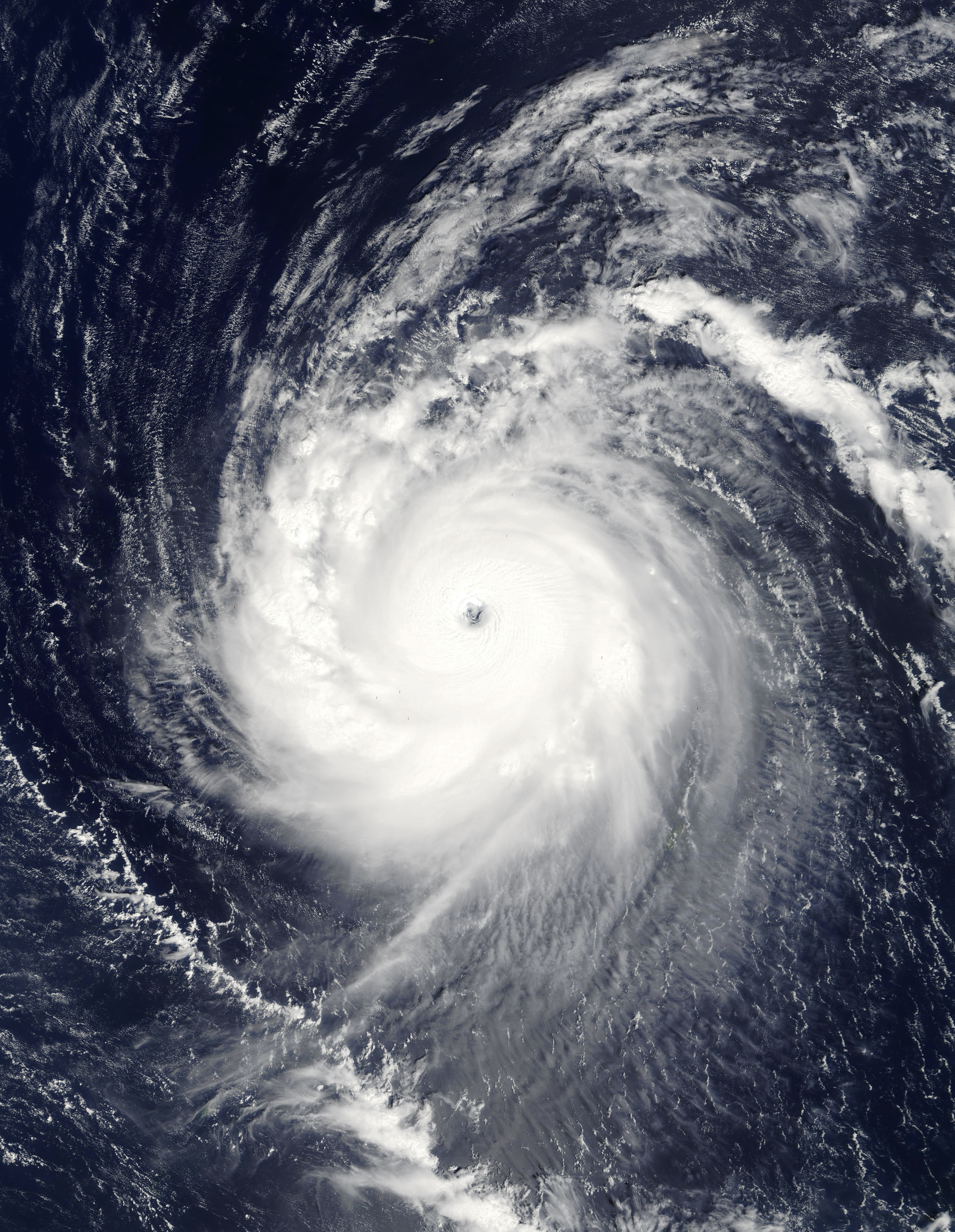
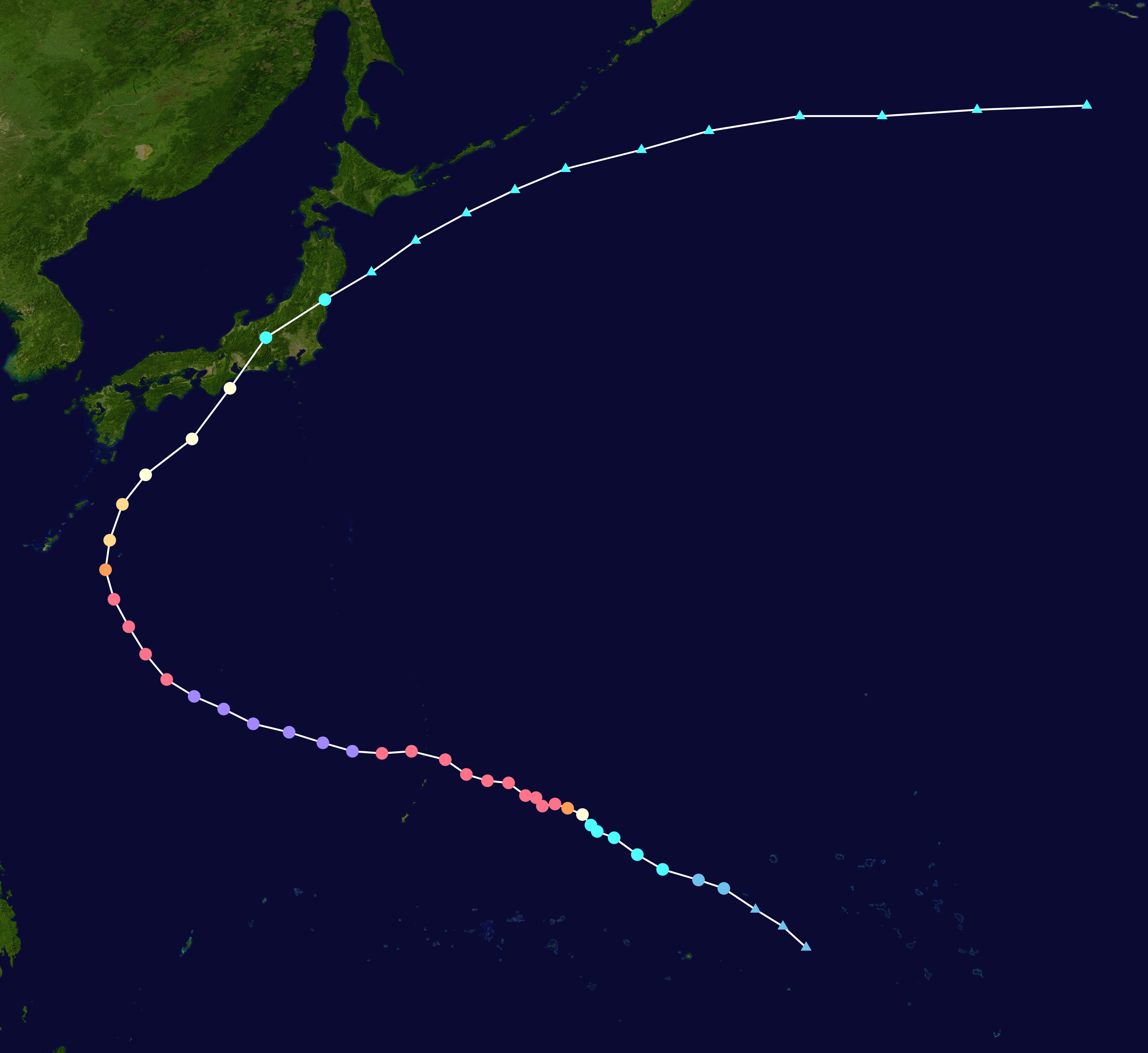
- Duration: September 29 – October 8
- Peak intensity: 205 km/h (125 mph) (10-min); 910 hPa (mbar)

On September 28, an area of convectional cloudiness formed 370 km (230 mi) to the northeast of Pohnpei. Satellite imagery showed a Low Level Circulation Centre had begun to form. On the evening of September 28, due to a TUTT that was providing good outflow for the system and low-level vertical wind shear with a favorable environment, the JTWC issued a Tropical Cyclone Formation Alert. Early on September 29, both JMA and JTWC upgraded the system into a tropical depression. Early on September 30, JMA reported that the depression had intensified into a tropical storm and assigned its international designated name, Melor. At the same time JTWC also classified the depression as a tropical storm. Early on October 1, Melor intensified further from a severe tropical storm into a typhoon. Intensification continued, and by the afternoon of the same day the JTWC reported that Melor had intensified into a Category 1-equivalent typhoon. In just four hours, it intensified rapidly to a Category 3-equivalent typhoon, and continued to track towards northeast Luzon. Early on October 2, it strengthened to a Category 4-equivalent typhoon. After levelling out in intensity, it strengthened again on October 3. Early October 4, JTWC reported that Melor had intensified to a Category-5 equivalent super typhoon, with JMA reporting a central pressure of 910 hPa and winds of 205 km/h. On October 5, PAGASA allocated the name Quedan to the typhoon as the storm moved into Philippine's area of responsibility. It interacted with Typhoon Parma in Parma's second landfall in the Philippines. By the midday of October 8, Melor made landfall on Japan. After landfall, JMA downgraded Melor into a severe tropical storm, while the JTWC downgraded it into an extratropical storm. Late on October 11, the extratropical remnants of Melor were completely absorbed by a newly formed extratropical storm system to the north, near Alaska. This system then strengthened and began to impact the West Coast of the United States, late on October 11.

=== Tropical Storm Nepartak ===
- Tropical storm (JMA)
- Tropical storm (SSHWS)
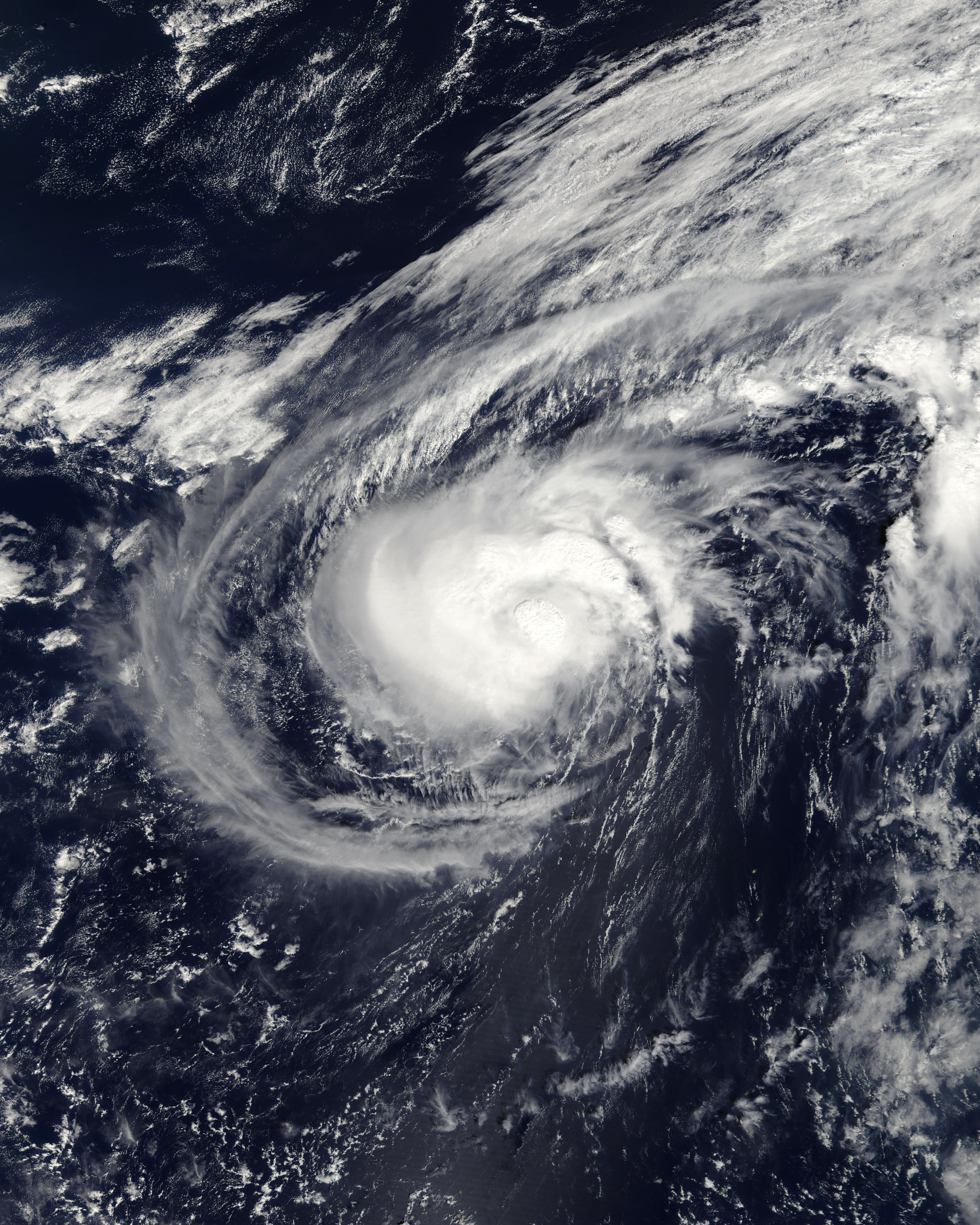
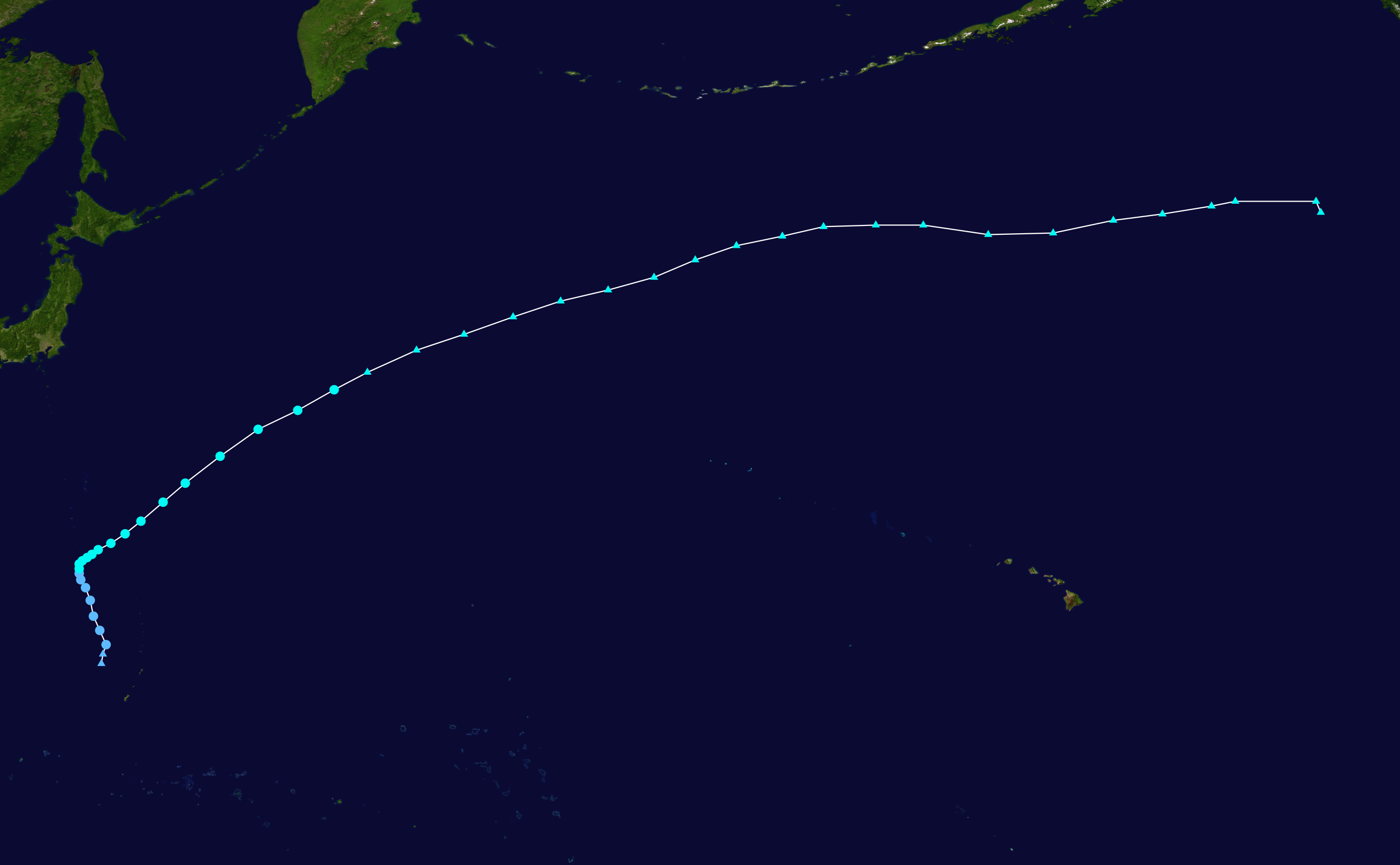
- Duration: October 8 – October 13
- Peak intensity: 85 km/h (50 mph) (10-min); 992 hPa (mbar)

On October 6, an area of convectional cloudiness associated with the monsoon trough formed 500 km (310 mi) to the southwest of Saipan. Satellite imagery showed a consolidating Low Level Circulation Center with formative convective banding and deep convection over the northern semicircle. During the morning of October 8, the system started to move northwest and its LLCC rapidly became well defined due to favorable conditions. The JMA then upgraded it to a tropical depression, and the JTWC issued a TCFA on the system, as it had started to become better defined. Then in the evening of that day, it was upgraded into a tropical depression by the JTWC. On October 9, the JMA upgraded it to a tropical storm and assigned its international name Nepartak. After the JMA upgraded it to a tropical storm, it slowly intensified to a peak intensity of 50 mph (80 km/h), but dissipated on October 14, because the polar jet stream had torn apart the storm.

=== Typhoon Lupit (Ramil) ===
- Very strong typhoon (JMA)
- Category 5 super typhoon (SSHWS)
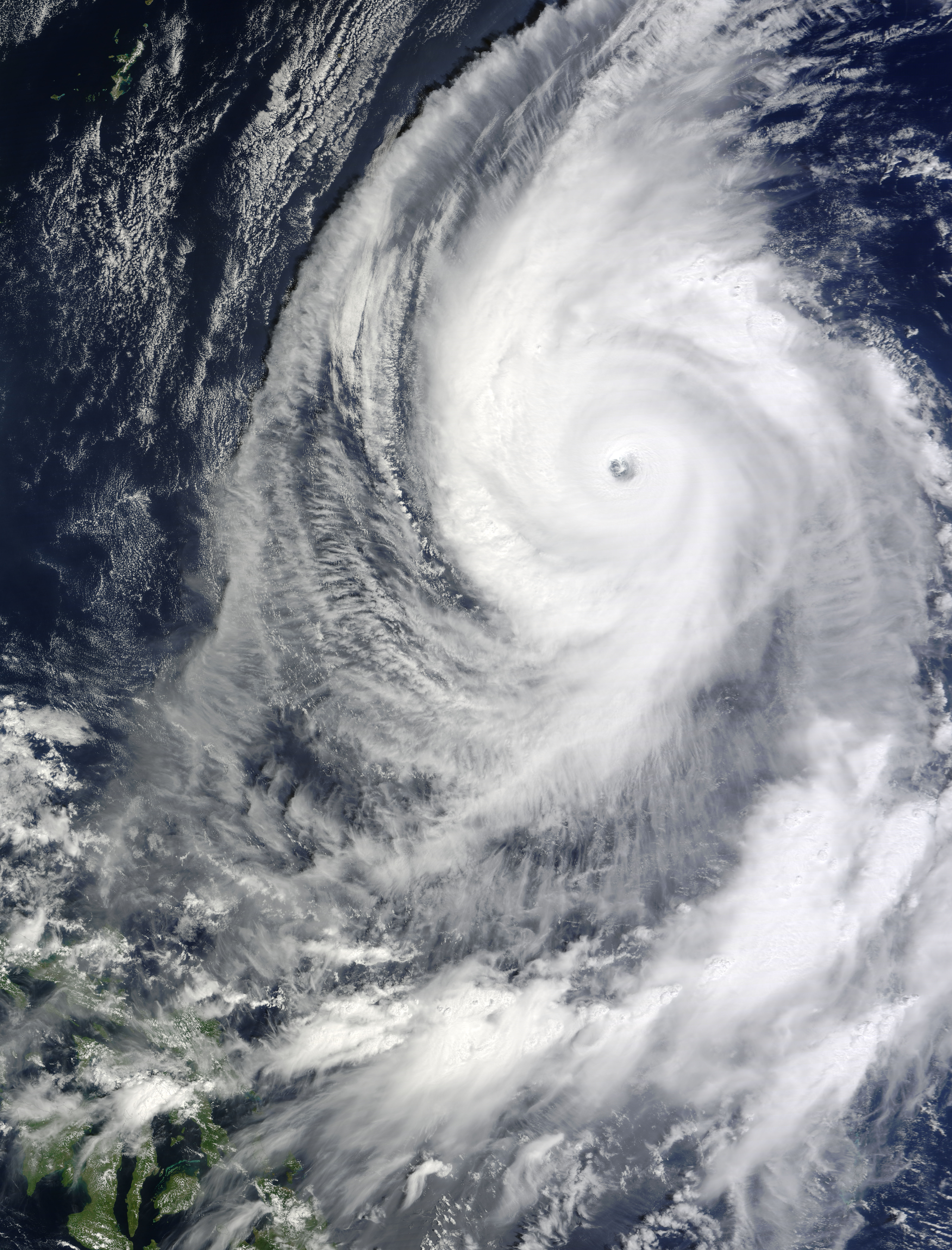
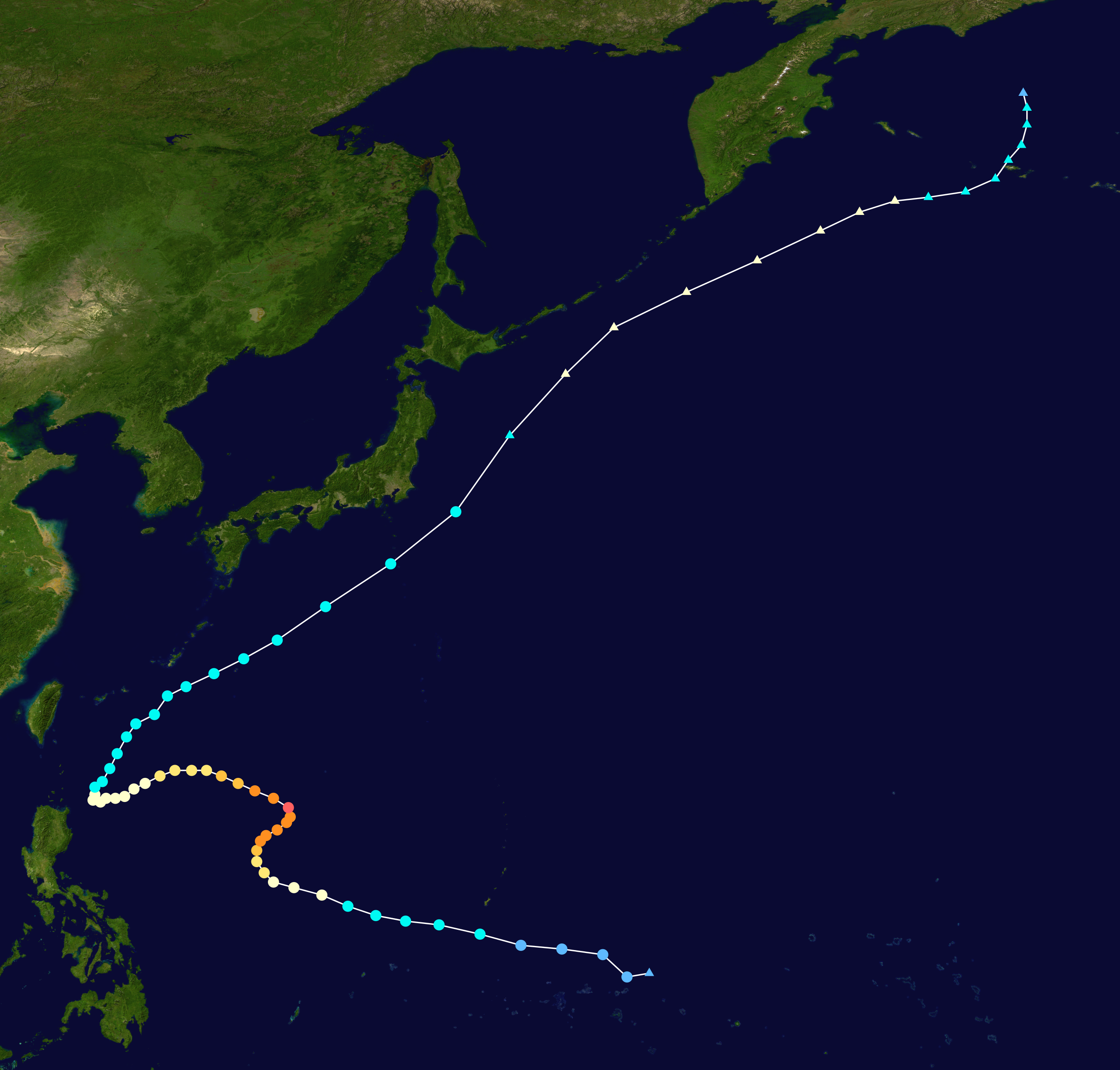
- Duration: October 14 – October 27
- Peak intensity: 175 km/h (110 mph) (10-min); 930 hPa (mbar)

Early on October 13, the JTWC reported that an area of disorganized deep convection had persisted about 1,870 km (1,160 mi) to the southeast of Hagåtña, Guam. The convection had a broad circulation center that was beginning to consolidate in an area of low vertical windshear and favorable sea surface temperatures. Later that day, as the low-level circulation center had consolidated further, the JTWC released a Tropical Cyclone Formation Alert before early the next day both the JMA and the JTWC initiated advisories on the system as it had intensified into Tropical Depression 22W. During that day the depressions low-level circulation center continued to organize with deep convective bands starting to wrap into the center.

Early on October 13, the JTWC reported that an area of convection had persisted about 380 nmi (700 km) to the northwest of Kwajalein. The convection was disorganised but was starting to consolidate around a broad low-level circulation center within a favourable environment to develop further with good vertical windshear and favourable sea surface temperatures. The disturbance rapidly developed throughout that day with a Tropical Cyclone Formation Alert issued later that day by the JTWC before advisories were initiated early the next day by the JMA and the JTWC who designated it as Tropical Depression 22W before the JTWC reported that the depression had intensified into a weak tropical storm. On October 15, JMA upgraded it to a Tropical Storm with the name Lupit. On the afternoon of next day, JTWC reported that Lupit strengthened into a Category 1 typhoon. That evening, PAGASA started issuing warnings on Lupit as it entered into their area of responsibility and assigned its local name, Ramil. At the same time JMA also upgraded Lupit into a typhoon. Intensification continued due to favorable conditions and hot water conditions, then by October 17, it rapidly intensified into a Category 3-equivalent typhoon. In the morning of the next day, it strengthened into a Category 4 typhoon, then strengthened further to Super Typhoon classification. On October 20, Lupit weakened to a minimal typhoon. By the 24th, dry air entrainment and an unfavorable environment had weakened Lupit further to a strong tropical storm, and caused the storm to change track from its westward drift to accelerate northeastward. Later that day, JTWC and PAGASA issued their final warning as Lupit was beginning extratropical transition. However, the JMA continued to issue warnings on Lupit until early on October 27.

=== Typhoon Mirinae (Santi) ===
- Typhoon (JMA)
- Category 2 typhoon (SSHWS)
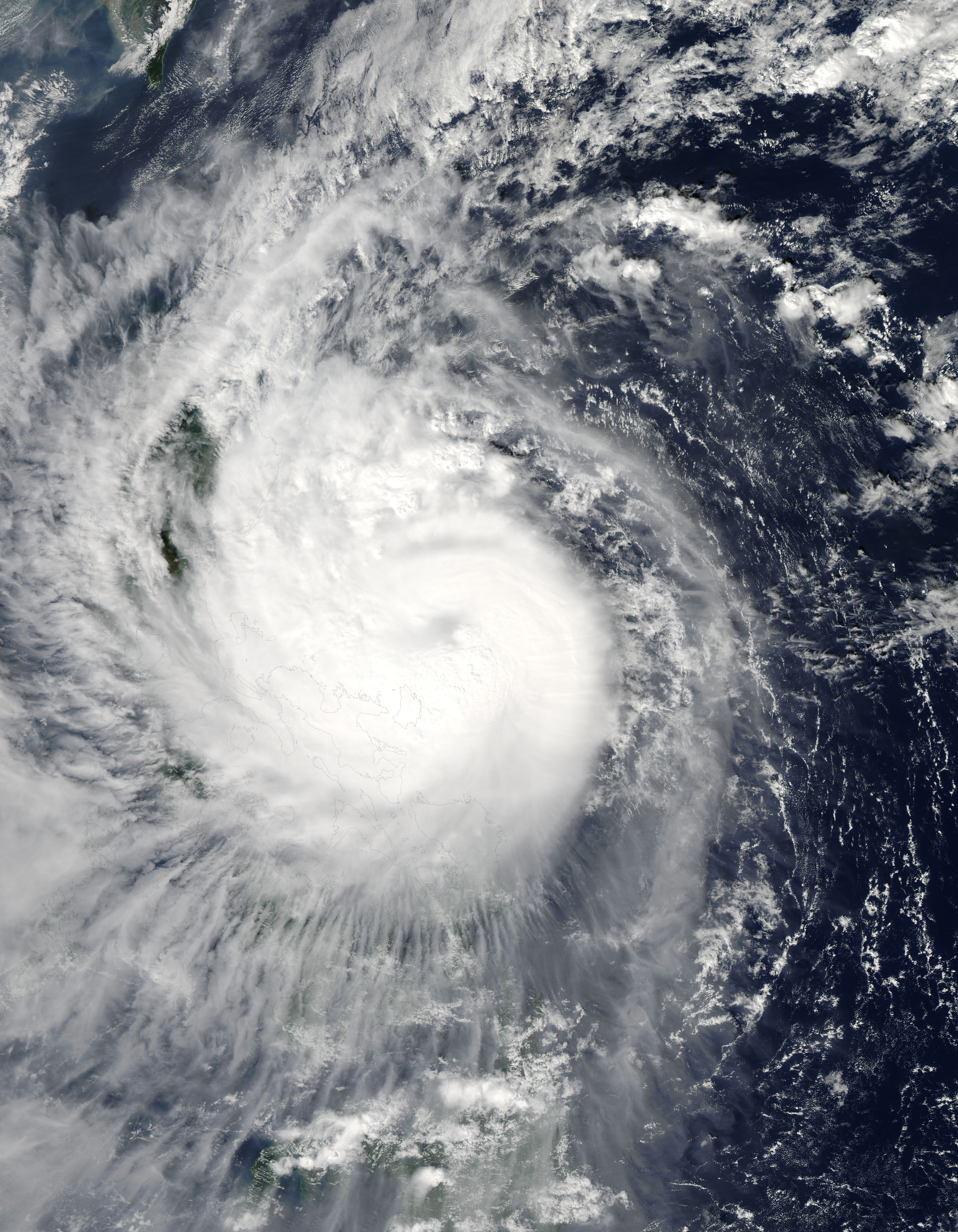
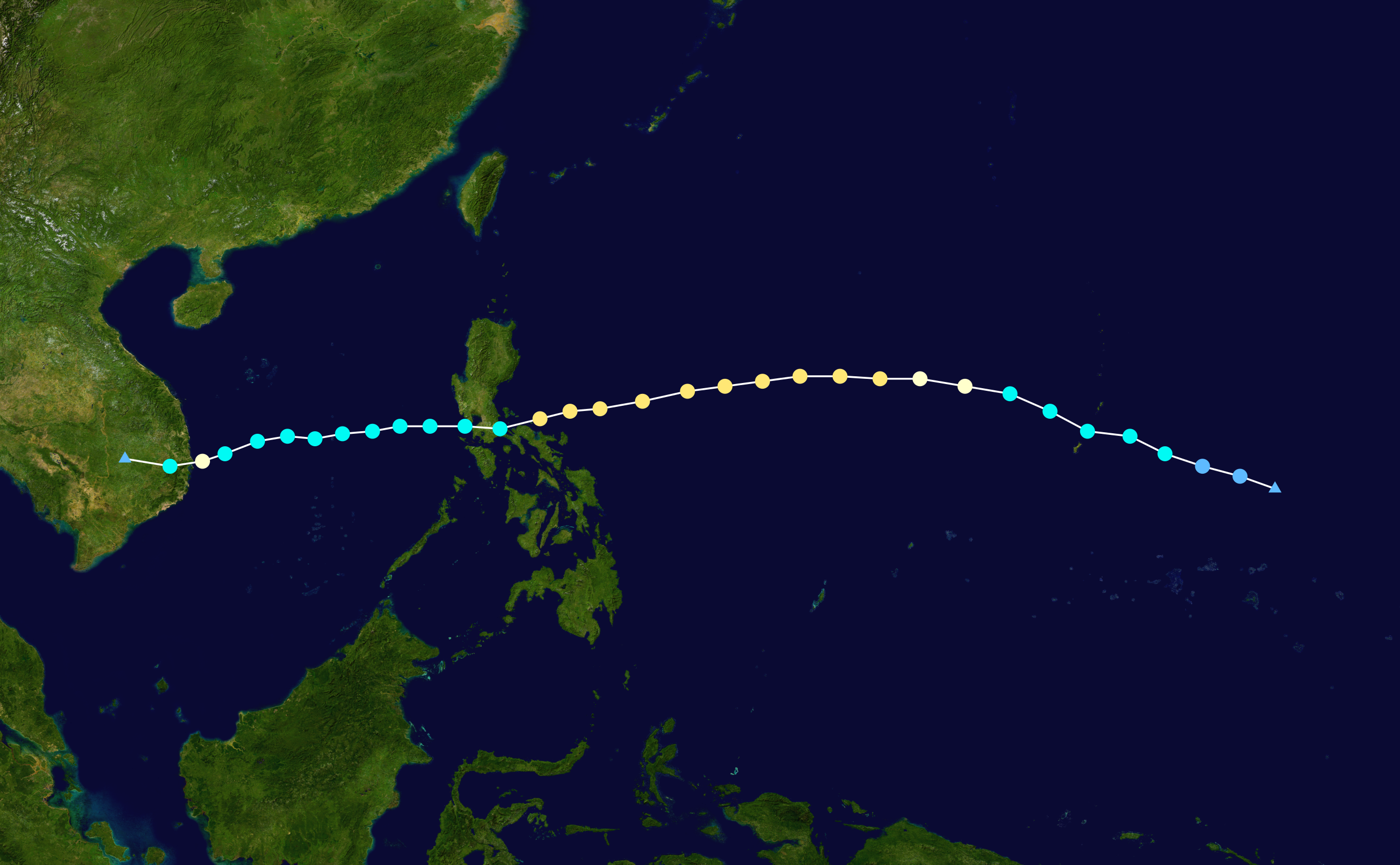
- Duration: October 25 – November 3
- Peak intensity: 150 km/h (90 mph) (10-min); 955 hPa (mbar)

JMA upgraded a Tropical Depression to Tropical Storm Mirinae on October 27, and it rapidly strengthened to a Typhoon, to a peak of 105-110 mph. It did not strengthen much further, due to wind shear and its fast movement. PAGASA allocated the name Santi to the system the next day, as the storm had entered their area of responsibility. Then Mirinae crossed the Philippines, causing it to rapidly deorganize and was downgraded from a Category 2 Typhoon, to a tropical storm in one advisory. It then crossed into the South China Sea, and slowly, but steadily strengthened until it was very close to Vietnam. Where it intensified to a Typhoon again. It made landfall and rapidly weakened.

A meteorological station in Tuy Hoà (Phú Yên) recorded wind gusts of 119 km/h (74 mph) and the lowest sea-level pressure of 989.5 hPa. The typhoon combined with cold air, caused heavy rainfall over a wide area in several provinces in Central Vietnam and the Central Highlands.

Mirinae's main effect in the Philippines is the strong winds it brings. From the night of October 30 until the next day, Southern Luzon, including Metro Manila, experienced lashing winds from the typhoon, where in Manila, minimal tropical storm force winds were at 39 m/h with gusts of 56 m/h at 6 a.m. local time, thus downing trees and made significant damage to several infrastructures. During Mirinae's passage in the Philippines, rainfall amounts from the typhoon were less than six inches recorded. Casualties from Mirinae both in the Philippines and Vietnam reached 162, with cost of damage amounting to $295 million (2009 USD).

=== Tropical Depression 24W (Tino) ===
- Tropical depression (JMA)
- Tropical depression (SSHWS)
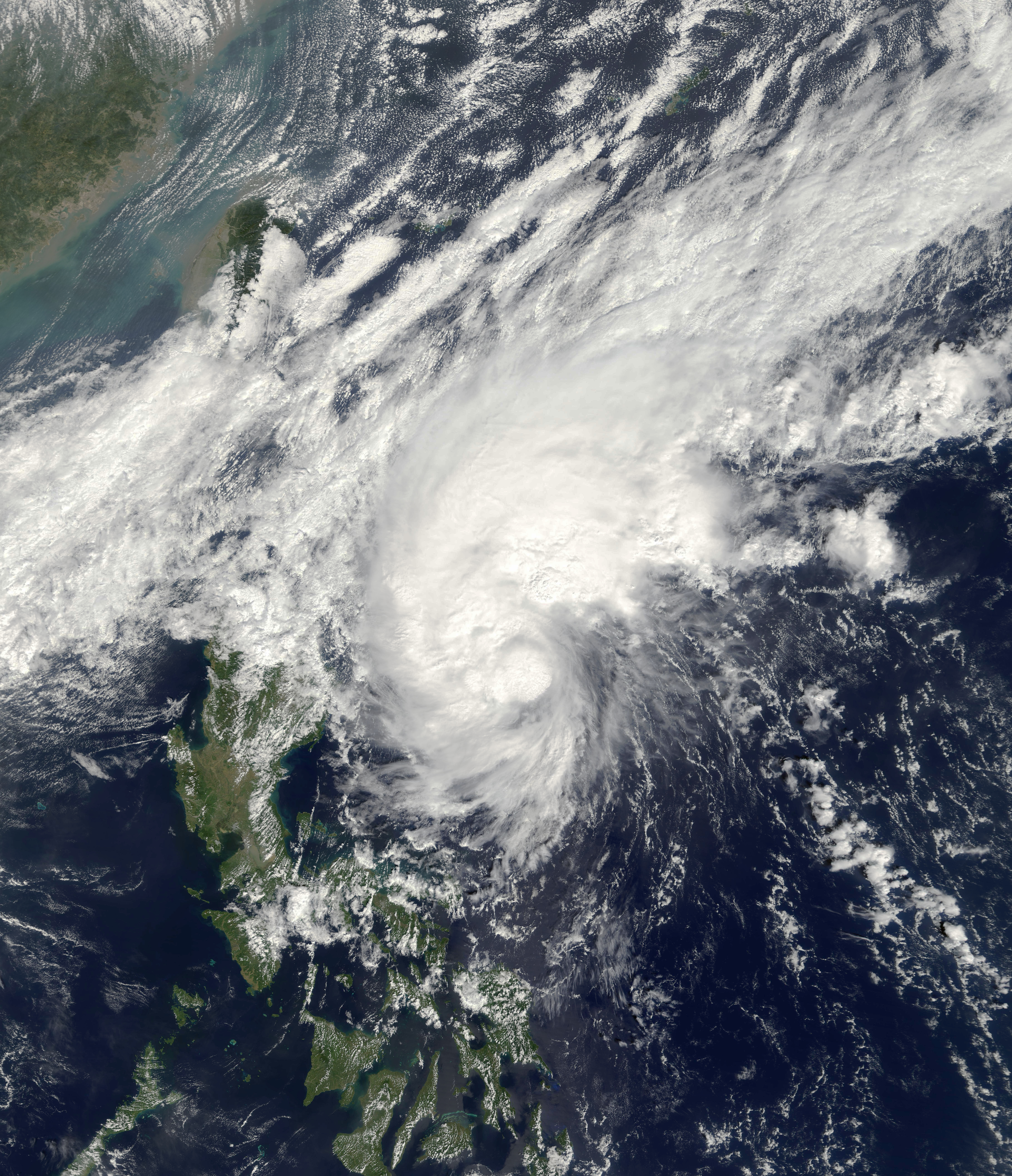
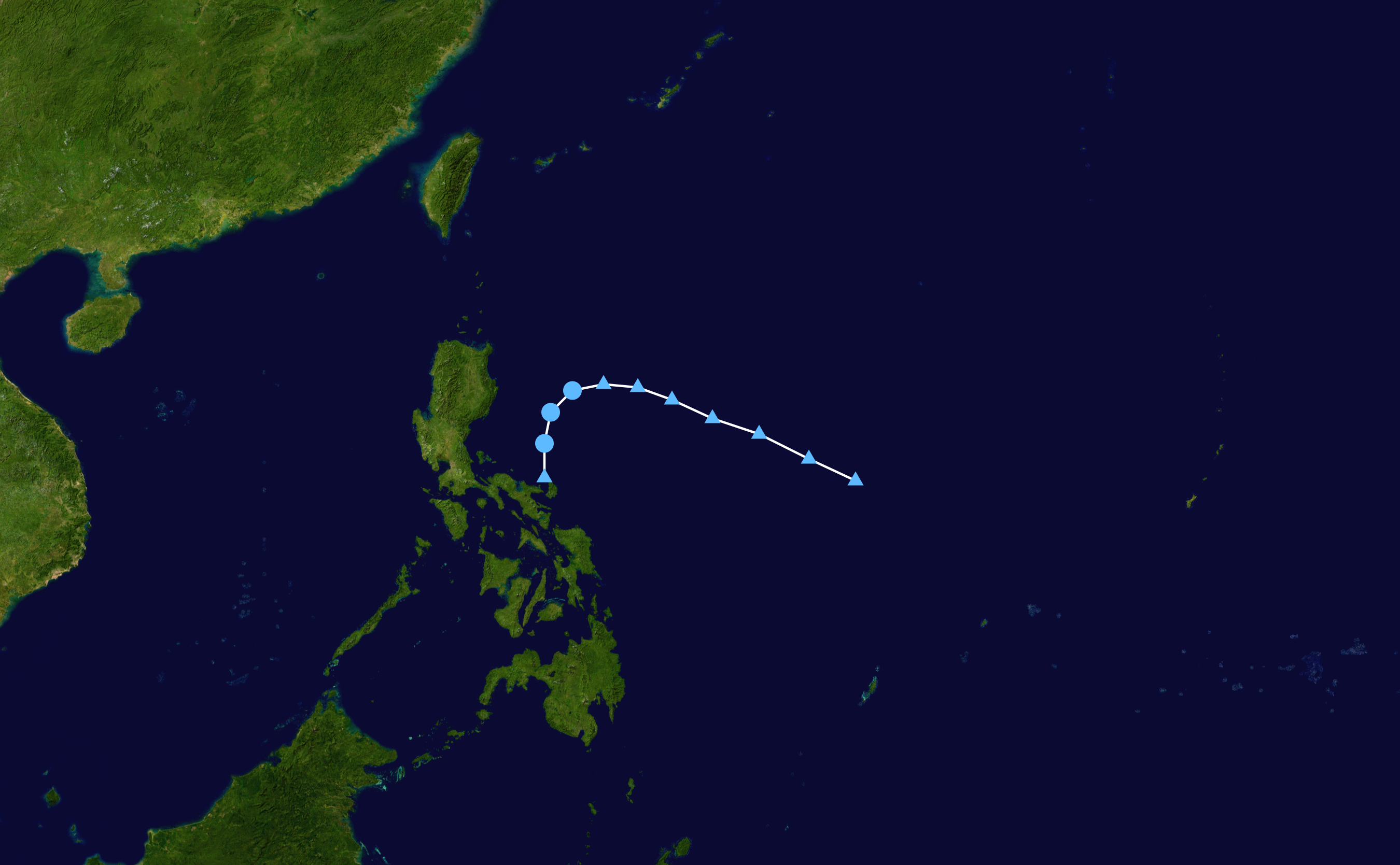
- Duration: November 1 – November 2
- Peak intensity: 55 km/h (35 mph) (10-min); 1006 hPa (mbar)

Late on October 31, the JTWC reported that a tropical disturbance had formed within an area of moderate vertical windshear about 1,400 km (870 mi), to the east of Manila, Philippines. Deep convection had started to form over a low-level circulation center. The JMA then reported early the next day that the disturbance had intensified into a weak tropical depression. However at this time the JTWC did not upgrade the disturbance to a tropical depression, instead issuing a Tropical Cyclone Formation Alert later that day as the depressions poleward outflow improved. Early on November 2, PAGASA named the depression as Tino as it was now located about 540 km (340 mi), to the northeast of Manila. Later that day the JTWC designated the depression as 24W, despite the system now encountering unfavorable levels of vertical windshear which made the low-level circulation center become fully exposed with no deep convection existing near the center. As a result of this early on November 3, the JMA, the JTWC and PAGASA all issued their final advisories.

=== Tropical Depression 25W ===
- Tropical depression (JMA)
- Tropical storm (SSHWS)
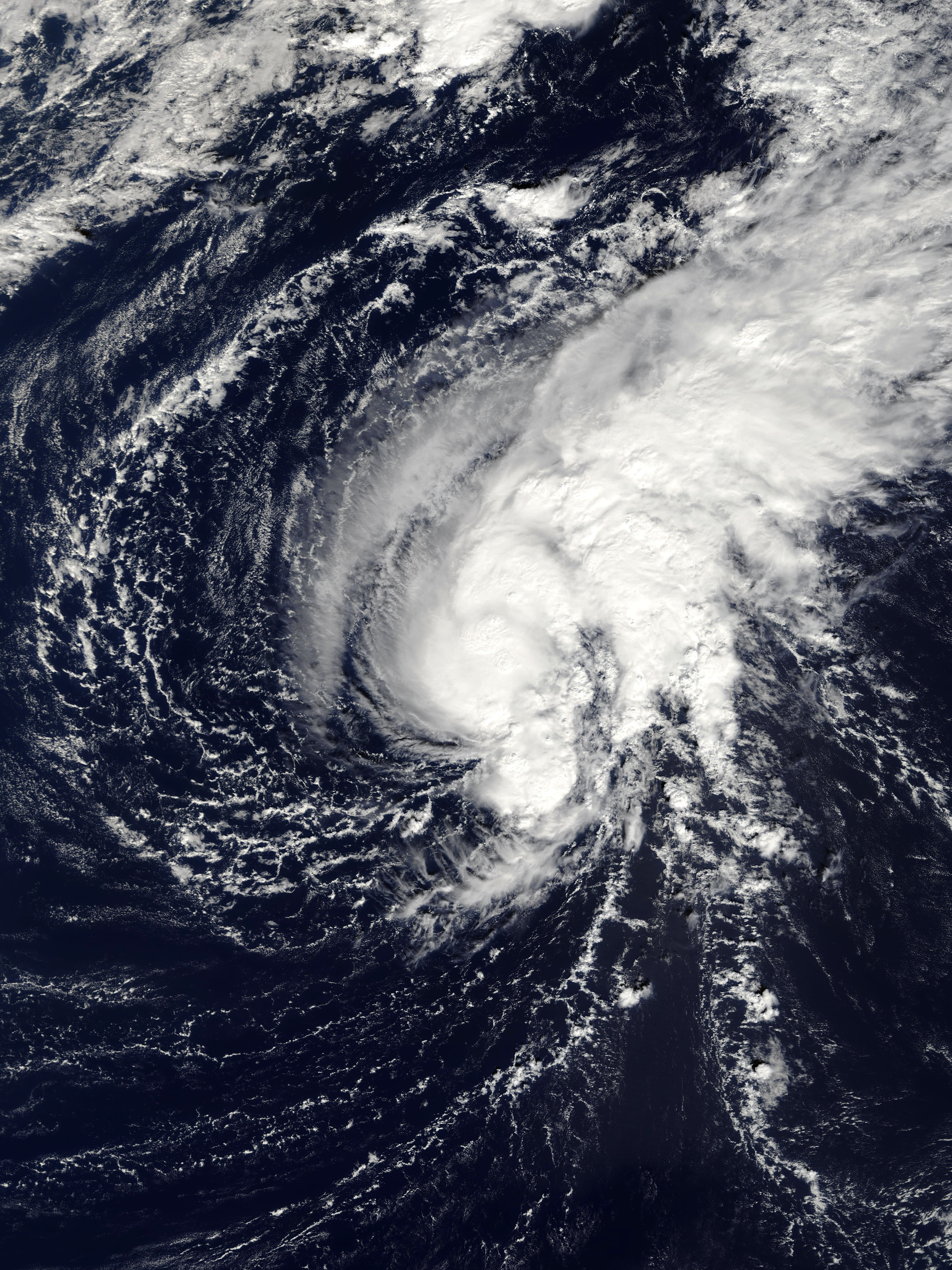
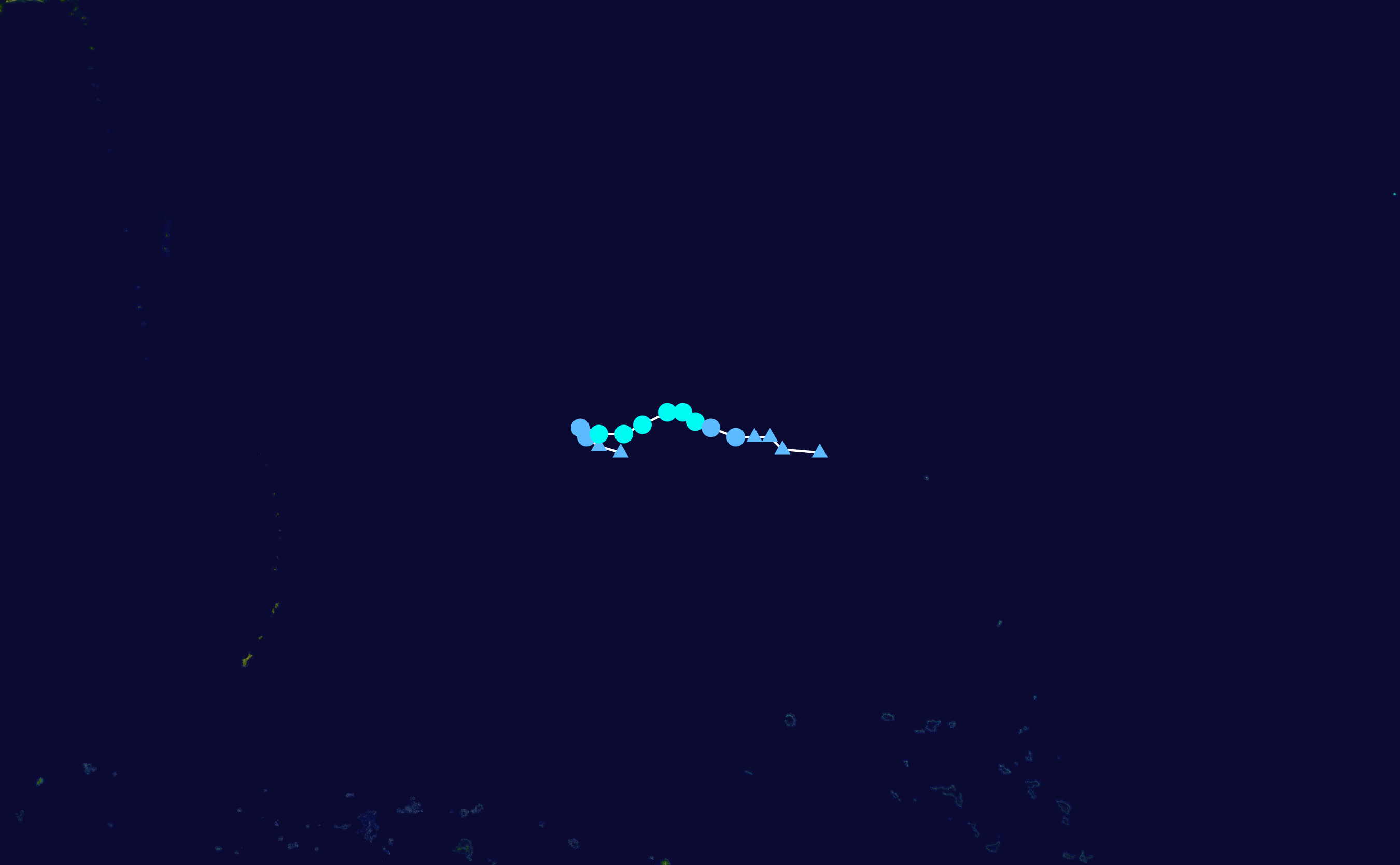
- Duration: November 7 – November 10
- Peak intensity: 55 km/h (35 mph) (10-min); 1000 hPa (mbar)

An area of low-pressure formed near the International Date Line on November 1. Early on November 3, the JTWC reported that an area of convection had persisted in a monsoon trough about 440 nmi (810 km) to the southeast of Pohnpei. The convection was poorly organized and was located in a monsoon trough amidst a weak and elongated circulation with weak mid-level turning. However, environmental conditions were not favourable for the disturbance to develop as it was located in an area of moderate vertical windshear. Over the next few days the disturbances gradually developed a low-level circulation center and as a result was designated as a tropical depression early on November 7 by both the JMA and the JTWC.

=== Tropical Depression 27W (Urduja) ===
- Tropical depression (JMA)
- Tropical depression (SSHWS)
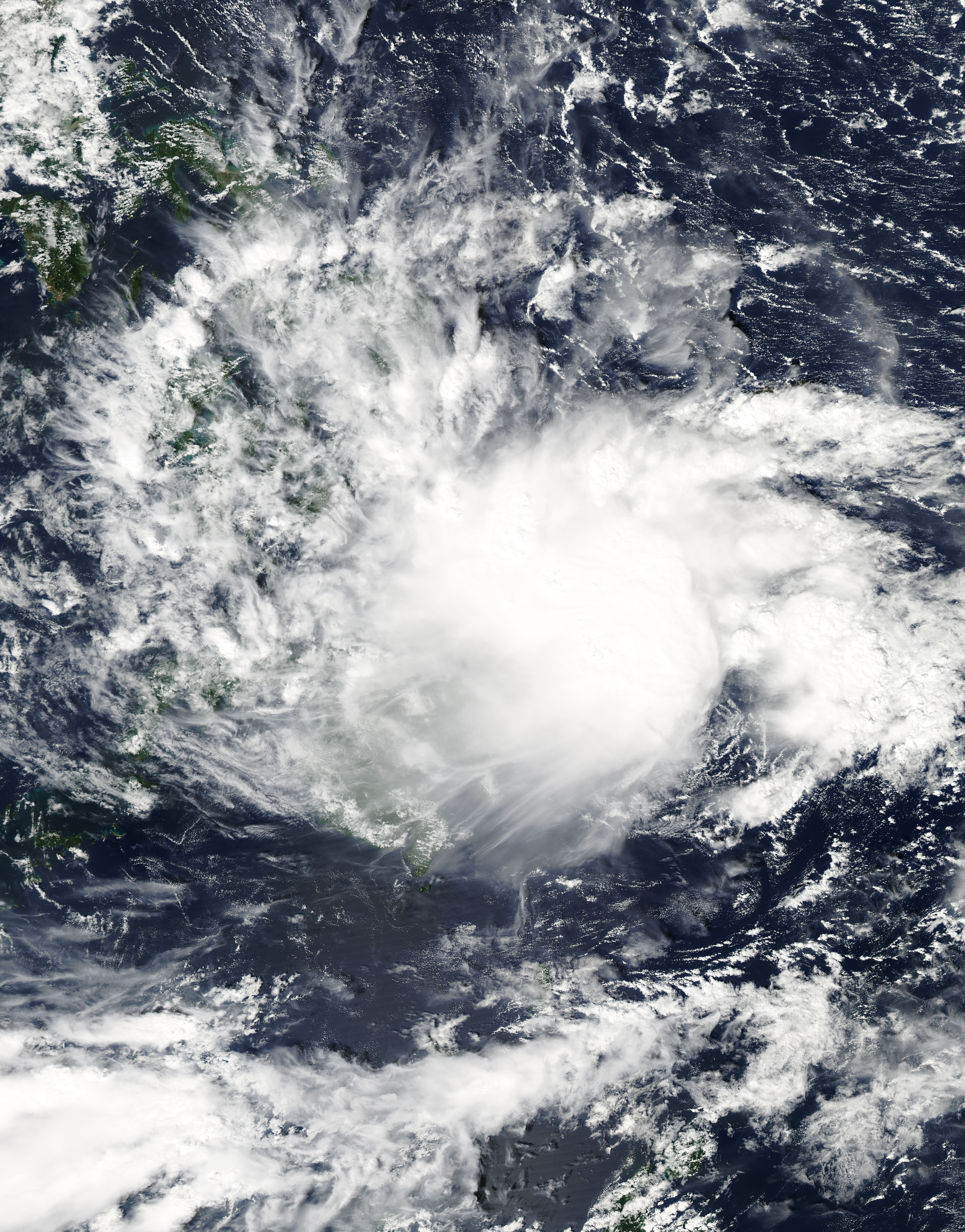
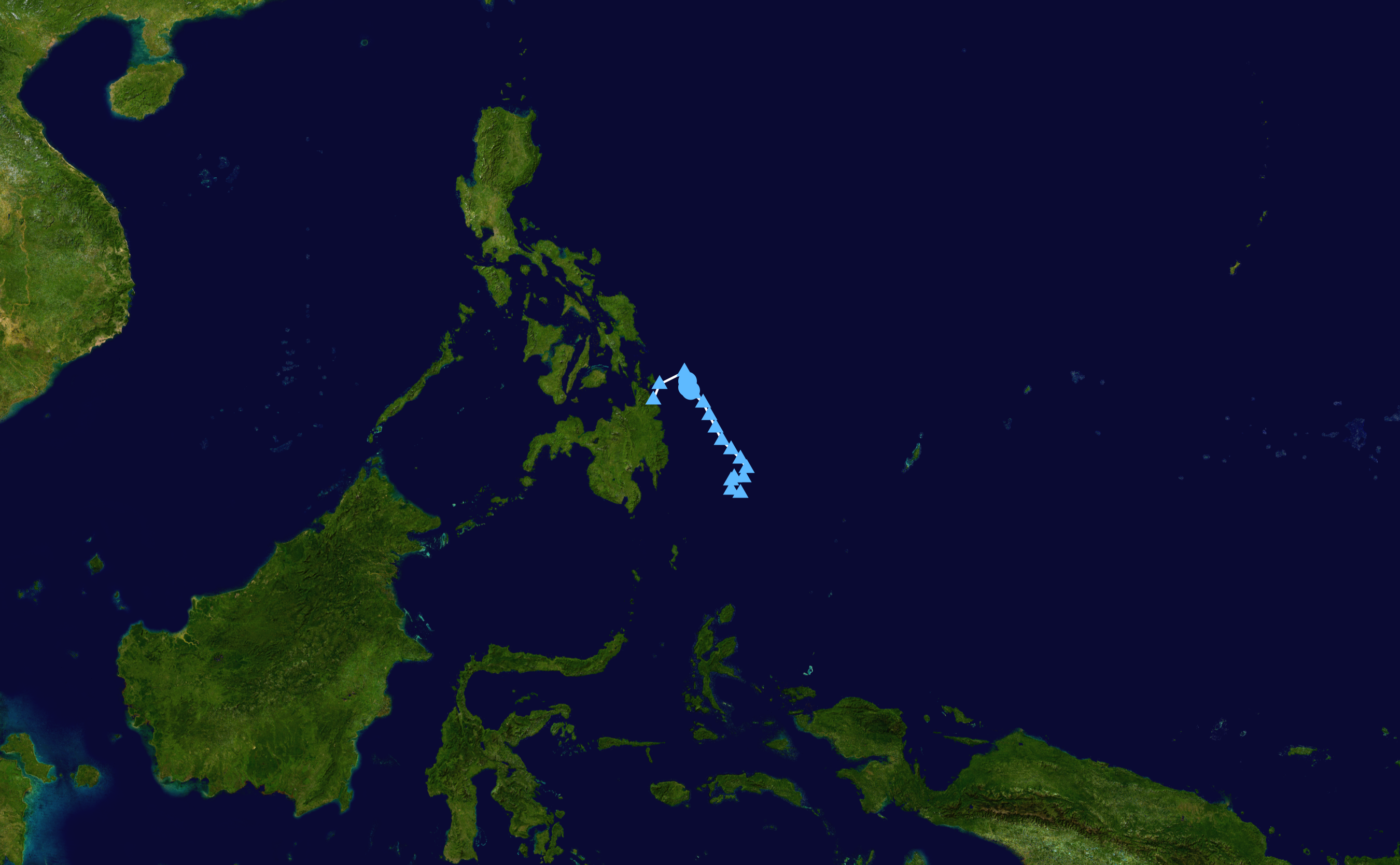
- Duration: November 21 – November 24
- Peak intensity: 55 km/h (35 mph) (10-min); 1002 hPa (mbar)

On November 23, PAGASA announced that a low-pressure area east of Mindanao had developed into a Tropical Depression and had been named "Urduja". The same day JTWC designated the tropical depression as 27W. Early Of November 25, the depression has weakened into an area of low pressure. The remnants of Urduja were absorbed into Typhoon Nida during November 25 and 26. In Eastern Visayas, 1, 519 passengers were stranded, 719 in Western Visayas, 399 in Bicol and 185 in Southern Luzon due to Urduja. In all, four people were killed by Urduja, three due to a landslide and one from electrocution.

=== Typhoon Nida (Vinta) ===
- Violent typhoon (JMA)
- Category 5 super typhoon (SSHWS)
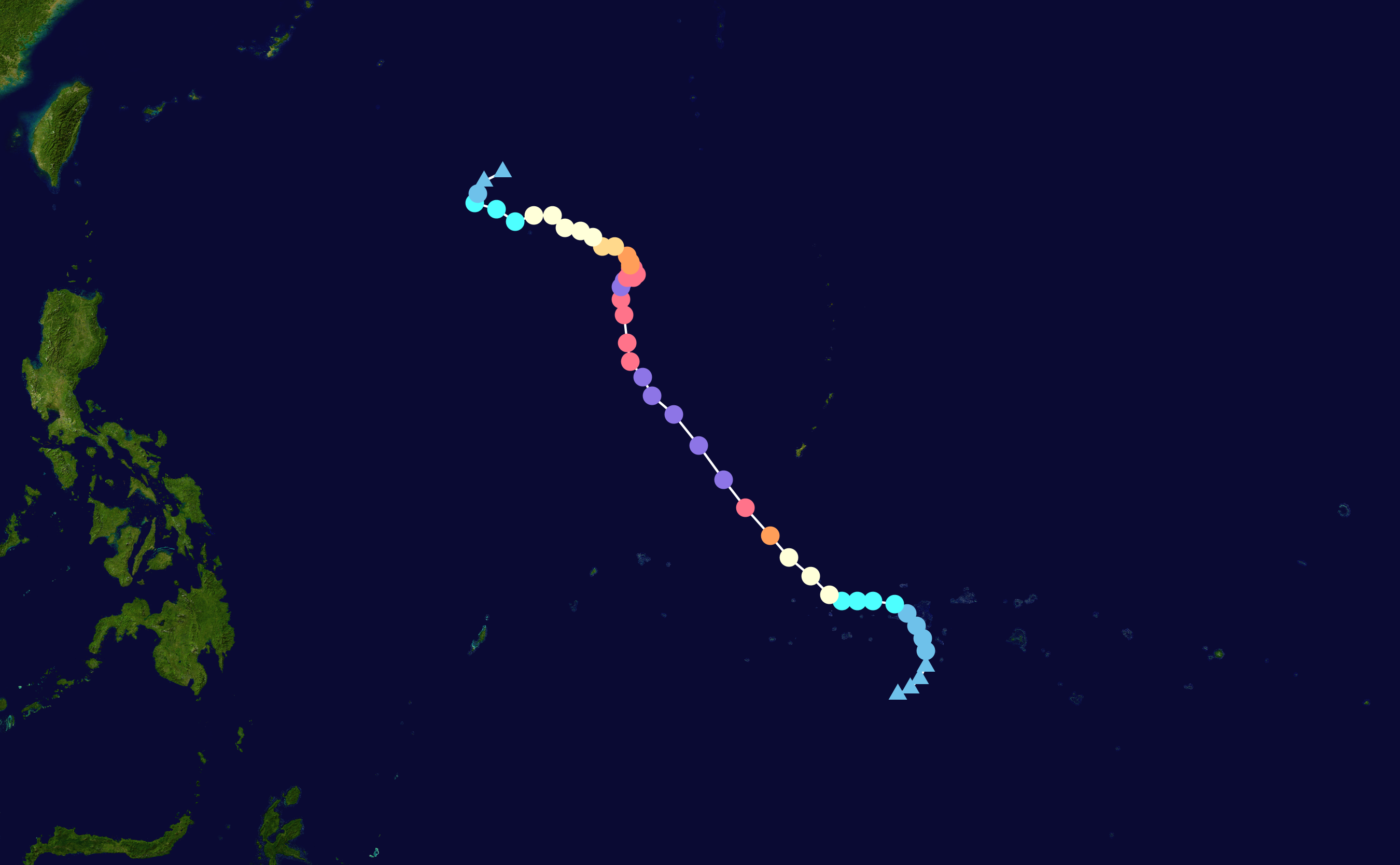
- Duration: November 21 – December 3
- Peak intensity: 215 km/h (130 mph) (10-min); 905 hPa (mbar)

Early on November 21, an area of convection persisted within a monsoon trough about 880 km (550 mi) to the southeast of Guam. With minimal wind shear, the convection consolidated around an elongated center. It developed into a tropical depression on November 21, which moved generally northwestward around the subtropical ridge. On November 23, the JMA upgraded the depression to Tropical Storm Nida. Later that day, an eye developed in the center, and Nida intensified into typhoon status on November 25. It rapidly intensified amid favorable conditions, reaching peak 10-minute wind speeds of 195 km/h (121 mph), with a peak pressure of 905 hPa. During the next day, the JTWC also reported that Typhoon Nida had rapidly intensified over the previous 18 hours into a category five super typhoon with winds of 285 km/h (177 mph), as it maintained a well defined symmetrical structure. The JTWC then reported that Nida had intensified a little bit more and reached its peak 1-minute sustained wind speeds of 290 km/h (180 mph). The typhoon later weakened to a category four, before re-strengthening to a category five on November 27, remaining quasi-stationary for more than two days. It weakened to a tropical depression on December 2 due to stronger vertical wind shear associated by the Northeast monsoon. The storm fully dissipated on December 4.

Early on November 24, the National Weather Service Weather Forecast Office in Tiyan, Guam (NWS Guam) placed the island of Faraulep under a tropical storm warning, before later that morning issuing tropical storm watches for Fais and Ulithi. As Nida was upgraded to a typhoon by the JTWC, the NWS upgraded the tropical storm warning for Faraulep to a typhoon warning. Later that day they reported that the typhoon warning for Faraulep had been cancelled as Nida was moving to the northwest away from Faraulep before early the next day the tropical storm warning for Fais and Ulithi were cancelled.

=== Tropical Depression 28W ===
- Tropical depression (JMA)
- Tropical storm (SSHWS)
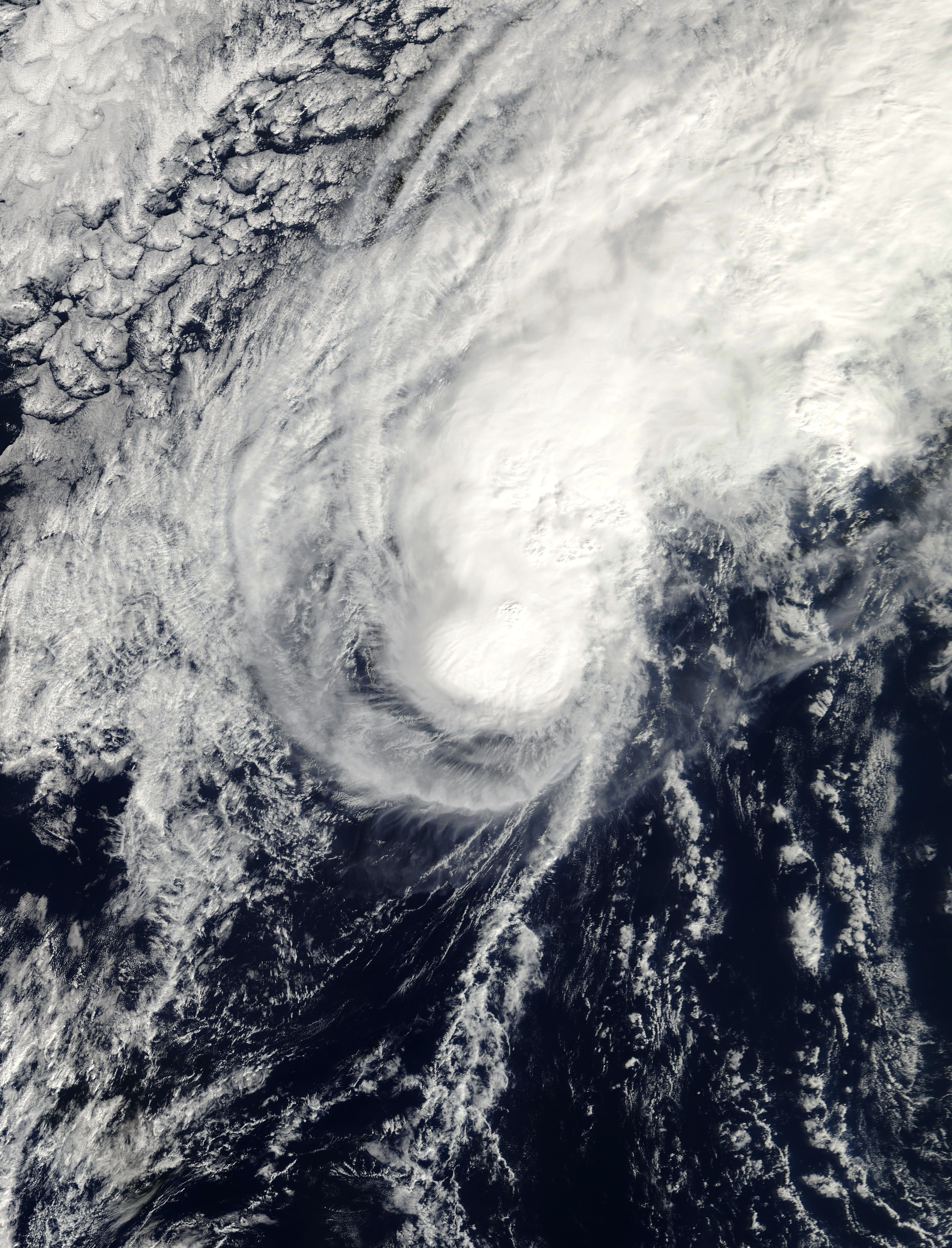
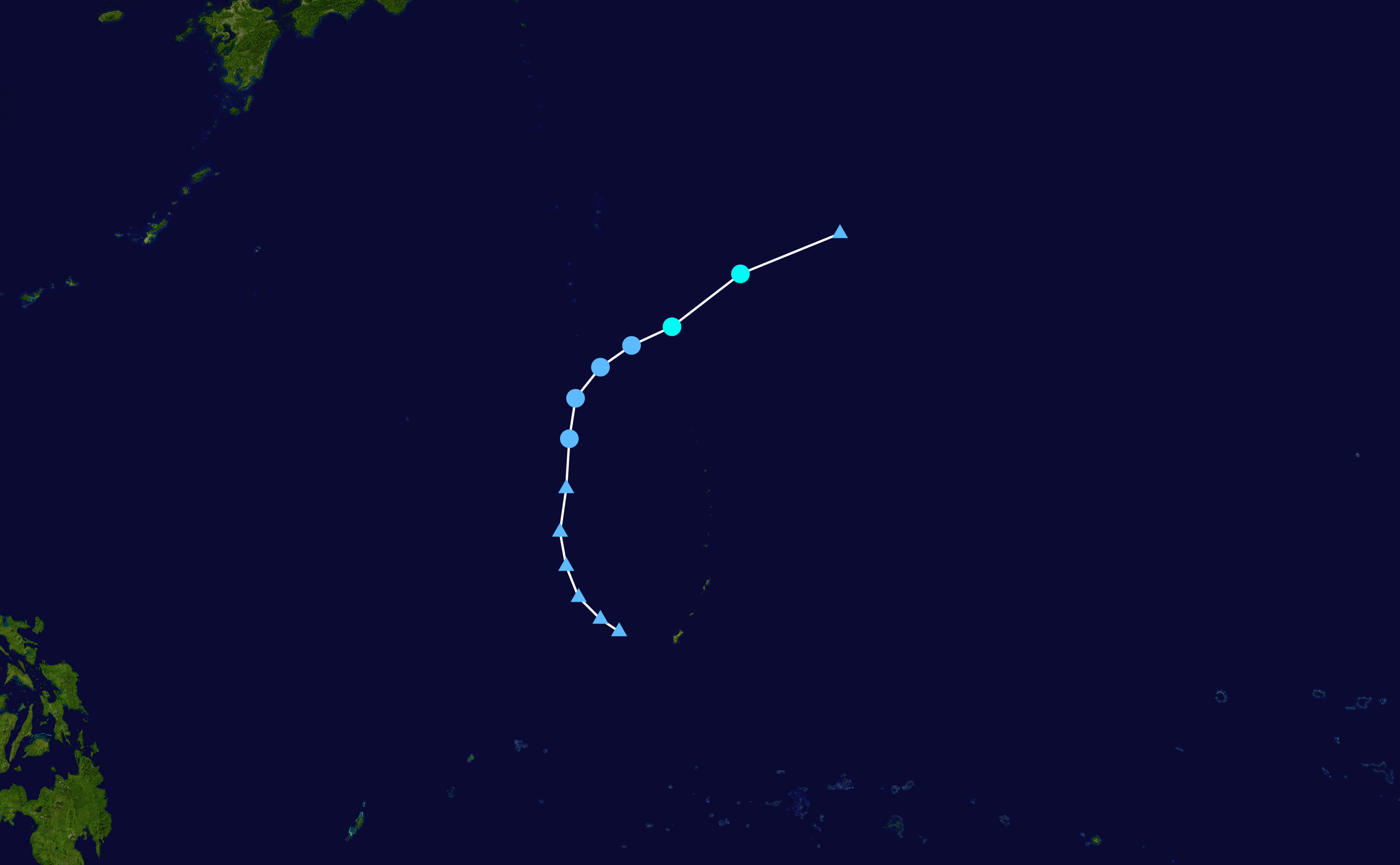
- Duration: December 3 – December 5
- Peak intensity: 45 km/h (30 mph) (10-min); 1000 hPa (mbar)

On November 29 the JTWC reported that an area of unorganized deep convection had persisted about 1,300 km (810 mi) to the north of Honiara, in the Solomon Islands. Deep convection was slowly consolidating around a poorly defined low-level circulation centre, in an area of moderate to high vertical wind shear. Over the next couple of days the moderate to high vertical wind shear prevented the disturbance's low-level circulation centre from consolidating further. On December 2, the JTWC issued a TCFA as the disturbance moved close to the upper-level ridge axis which was providing an area of low vertical wind shear and gave the system a good chance of development within 12–24 hours. During the next day, the JMA reported that the disturbance had intensified into a tropical depression before the JTWC cancelled the TCFA and downgraded the depression's chance of becoming a significant tropical cyclone within 24 hours to poor, as the low-level circulation center had become elongated and exposed whilst deep convection had become poorly organized and displaced. As a consequence of the depression moving into an area of higher vertical wind shear, deep convection had become sheared to the north and northwest of the centre. Throughout December 4, the JTWC assessed the depression's chances of becoming a significant tropical cyclone within 24 hours as poor. However early the next day the JTWC issued their first advisory on the depression, as they reported it had become a significant tropical cyclone and designated it as Tropical Storm 28W as deep convection had been sustained near the low-level circulation center, despite vertical wind shear in excess of 30 knots (56 km/h; 35 mph). The JTWC also issued their final warning at the same time as the depression was beginning to go through an extra tropical transition with dry air entering the cyclone and breaking down the storms warm core as it moved over an area of unfavourable vertical wind shear and sea surface temperatures of less than 26 °C (79 °F). The JMA then downgraded the tropical depression to an extratropical low, later that day.

=== Other systems ===
During May 1, a tropical depression had developed about 648 km (403 mi) north of Yap. The JTWC briefly issued a TCFA on the system during the next day. The tropical depression meandered northward until it was last noted on May 4 when it became an extratropical low. Another tropical depression had developed about 1,000 km (620 mi) southeast of Okinawa on August 25. However the JMA discontinued tracking on the system by the next day.

On September 23, a tropical depression had developed about 1,145 km (711 mi) southeast of Tokyo. As it moved northward the system started to weaken after its convection remained weak, therefore, the system dissipated on September 26. During October 16, a tropical depression formed over in favorable environments about 780 km (480 mi) to the southeast of Hue, Vietnam. By October 17, the JTWC issued a TCFA, although it was canceled few hours later. As the system's center became exposed and as it entered unfavorable environments, the system dissipated on October 20. On November 24, the JMA started to monitor a weak tropical depression to the northeast of Borneo. Although the system did not organize further and weakened to a low-pressure during the next day. On December 7, a weak tropical depression had formed to the east of Mindanao, Philippines until it fully dissipated during December 8.

== Storm names ==
Within the North-western Pacific Ocean, both the Japan Meteorological Agency (JMA) and the Philippine Atmospheric, Geophysical and Astronomical Services Administration assign names to tropical cyclones that develop in the Western Pacific, which can result in a tropical cyclone having two names. The Japan Meteorological Agency's RSMC Tokyo — Typhoon Center assigns international names to tropical cyclones on behalf of the World Meteorological Organization's Typhoon Committee, should they be judged to have 10-minute sustained wind speeds of 65 km/h (40 mph). While the Philippine Atmospheric, Geophysical and Astronomical Services Administration assigns names to tropical cyclones which move into or form as a tropical depression in their area of responsibility located between 135°E and 115°E and between 5°N-25°N even if the cyclone has had an international name assigned to it. The names of significant tropical cyclones are retired, by both PAGASA and the Typhoon Committee.

=== International names ===
During the season 23 named tropical cyclones developed in the Western Pacific and were named by the Japan Meteorological Agency, when it was determined that they had become tropical storms. These names were contributed to a list of a 140 names submitted by the fourteen members nations and territories of the ESCAP/WMO Typhoon Committee. The names Molave, Mujigae and Mirinae were used for the first time as it was replaced from Imbudo, Maemi and Sudal from the 2003 and 2004 seasons respectively.

Kujira	Chan-hom	Linfa	Nangka	Soudelor	Molave	Goni	Morakot	Etau	Vamco	Krovanh
Dujuan	Mujigae	Choi-wan	Koppu	Ketsana	Parma	Melor	Nepartak	Lupit	Mirinae	Nida

=== Other names ===
If a tropical cyclone enters the Western Pacific basin from the Eastern and Central Pacific basin (west of 180°E), it will retain the name assigned to it by the National Hurricane Center (NHC) and Central Pacific Hurricane Center (CPHC). The following storms were named in this manner.

- Maka

=== Philippines ===
Auring	Bising	Crising	Dante	Emong
Feria	Gorio	Huaning	Isang	Jolina
Kiko	Labuyo	Maring	Nando	Ondoy
Pepeng	Quedan	Ramil	Santi	Tino
Urduja	Vinta	Wilma (unused)	Yolanda (unused)	Zoraida (unused)
Auxiliary list
Alamid (unused)	Bruno (unused)	Conching (unused)	Dolor (unused)	Ernie (unused)
Florante (unused)	Gerardo (unused)	Hernan (unused)	Isko (unused)	Jerome (unused)

The Philippine Atmospheric, Geophysical and Astronomical Services Administration uses its own naming scheme for tropical cyclones in their area of responsibility. PAGASA assigns names to tropical depressions that form within their area of responsibility and any tropical cyclone that might move into their area of responsibility. Should the list of names for a given year prove to be insufficient, names are taken from an auxiliary list, the first 10 of which are published each year before the season starts. The names not retired from this list were used again in the 2013 season. This is the same list used in the 2005 season, except for Urduja which replaced Undang, because the name Undang had been retired in the 1984 season. Names that were not assigned are marked in gray. The names Ramil, Santi, Tino, Urduja and Vinta were used for the first time this year.

=== Retirement ===
The names Morakot, Ketsana, and Parma were retired by the ESCAP/WMO Typhoon Committee. The names Atsani, Champi, and In-fa were chosen to replace Morakot, Ketsana and Parma respectively.

The Philippine Atmospheric, Geophysical and Astronomical Services Administration (PAGASA) announced that the names Ondoy and Pepeng had their names retired after they both caused over 300 deaths and 1 billion PHP worth of damage in the Philippines. In June 2012, the names Odette and Paolo were chosen by PAGASA to replace Ondoy and Pepeng, respectively. The name Feria was also removed for unknown reasons, and was replaced with Fabian for the 2013 season.

== Season effects ==
This table will list all the storms that developed in the northwestern Pacific Ocean west of the International Date Line and north of the equator during 2009. It will include their intensity, duration, name, areas affected, deaths, and damage totals. Classification and intensity values will be based on estimations conducted by the JMA. All damage figures will be in 2009 USD. Damages and deaths from a storm will include when the storm was a precursor wave or an extra tropical low.

Name	Dates	Peak intensity			Areas affected	Damage (USD)	Deaths	Ref(s).
Name	Dates	Category	Wind speed	Pressure	Areas affected	Damage (USD)	Deaths	Ref(s).
Auring	January 3–6	Tropical depression	45 km/h (28 mph)	1,006 hPa (29.71 inHg)	Philippines	$490,000	2	
Bising	February 12–13	Tropical depression	45 km/h (28 mph)	1,002 hPa (29.59 inHg)	Philippines	None	None	
Crising	April 30 – May 1	Tropical depression	55 km/h (34 mph)	Not specified	Philippines	None	None	
Kujira (Dante)	May 1–7	Very strong typhoon	155 km/h (96 mph)	940 hPa (27.76 inHg)	Philippines, Russian Far East	$14.3 million	27	
TD	May 1–4	Tropical depression	55 km/h (34 mph)	1,004 hPa (29.65 inHg)	None	None	None	
Chan-hom (Emong)	May 2–9	Typhoon	120 km/h (75 mph)	975 hPa (28.79 inHg)	Vietnam, Philippines, Ryukyu Islands	$26.1 million	60	
Linfa	June 14–22	Severe tropical storm	110 km/h (68 mph)	975 hPa (28.79 inHg)	Philippines, Taiwan, China	$105 million	7	
Nangka (Feria)	June 22–27	Tropical storm	75 km/h (47 mph)	994 hPa (29.35 inHg)	Philippines, China	$54,000	6	
Soudelor (Gorio)	July 9–13	Tropical storm	65 km/h (40 mph)	992 hPa (29.29 inHg)	Philippines, China, Vietnam	$6.58 million	17	
06W (Huaning)	July 11–14	Tropical depression	55 km/h (34 mph)	1,000 hPa (29.53 inHg)	Taiwan, China	None	None	
Molave (Isang)	July 15–19	Typhoon	120 km/h (75 mph)	975 hPa (28.79 inHg)	Philippines, Taiwan, China	$8,000	5	
Goni (Jolina)	July 30 – August 9	Tropical storm	75 km/h (47 mph)	988 hPa (29.18 inHg)	Philippines, China, Vietnam	Minor	8	
Morakot (Kiko)	August 2–11	Typhoon	140 km/h (87 mph)	945 hPa (27.91 inHg)	Philippines, Japan, Taiwan, China, Korea	$6.2 billion	789	
Etau	August 8–14	Tropical storm	75 km/h (47 mph)	992 hPa (29.29 inHg)	Japan	$1.44 billion	28	
Maka	August 13–17	Tropical depression	55 km/h (34 mph)	1,006 hPa (29.71 inHg)	None	None	None	
Vamco	August 16–26	Very strong typhoon	165 km/h (103 mph)	945 hPa (27.91 inHg)	None	None	None	
TD	August 20–21	Tropical depression	55 km/h (34 mph)	1,002 hPa (29.59 inHg)	Japan	None	None	
TD	August 25–27	Tropical depression	55 km/h (34 mph)	1,004 hPa (29.65 inHg)	None	None	None	
Krovanh	August 28 – September 1	Severe tropical storm	110 km/h (68 mph)	975 hPa (28.79 inHg)	Japan	None	None	
02C	August 30 – September 2	Tropical depression	55 km/h (34 mph)	1,004 hPa (29.65 inHg)	None	None	None	
Dujuan (Labuyo)	September 1–10	Severe tropical storm	95 km/h (59 mph)	980 hPa (28.94 inHg)	Mariana Islands	None	None	
TD	September 3–9	Tropical depression	45 km/h (28 mph)	1,000 hPa (29.53 inHg)	Vietnam	$32 million	9	
Mujigae (Maring)	September 8–12	Tropical storm	75 km/h (47 mph)	990 hPa (29.23 inHg)	Philippines, China, Vietnam	$14.6 million	11	
Koppu (Nando)	September 12–16	Typhoon	120 km/h (75 mph)	975 hPa (28.79 inHg)	Philippines, China	$313 million	12	
Choi-wan	September 12–20	Violent typhoon	195 km/h (121 mph)	915 hPa (27.02 inHg)	Mariana Islands	Minor	None	
TD	September 23–26	Tropical depression	45 km/h (28 mph)	1,006 hPa (29.71 inHg)	Mariana Islands	Minor	None	
Ketsana (Ondoy)	September 25–30	Typhoon	130 km/h (81 mph)	960 hPa (28.35 inHg)	Philippines, Indochina	$1.15 billion	921	
18W	September 26–30	Tropical depression	55 km/h (34 mph)	1,000 hPa (29.53 inHg)	Mariana Islands, Caroline Islands	None	None	
Parma (Pepeng)	September 27 – October 14	Very strong typhoon	185 km/h (115 mph)	930 hPa (27.46 inHg)	Caroline Islands, Philippines, Taiwan, China, Vietnam	$617 million	500	
Melor (Quedan)	September 29 – October 8	Violent typhoon	205 km/h (127 mph)	910 hPa (26.87 inHg)	Caroline Islands, Mariana Islands, Japan	$1.5 billion	3	
Nepartak	October 8 – October 13	Tropical storm	85 km/h (53 mph)	992 hPa (29.29 inHg)	Mariana Islands	None	None	
Lupit (Ramil)	October 14–27	Very strong typhoon	175 km/h (109 mph)	930 hPa (27.46 inHg)	Caroline Islands, Philippines, Japan	Minor	None	
TD	October 16 – October 20	Tropical depression	45 km/h (28 mph)	1,002 hPa (29.59 inHg)	Vietnam, China	None	None	
Mirinae (Santi)	October 25 – November 3	Typhoon	150 km/h (93 mph)	955 hPa (28.20 inHg)	Caroline Islands, Mariana Islands, Philippines, Vietnam, Cambodia, Laos, Thailand	$423 million	162	
24W (Tino)	November 1–2	Tropical depression	55 km/h (34 mph)	1,006 hPa (29.71 inHg)	Philippines	None	None	
25W	November 7–10	Tropical depression	55 km/h (34 mph)	1,000 hPa (29.53 inHg)	None	None	None	
27W (Urduja)	November 21–24	Tropical depression	55 km/h (34 mph)	1,002 hPa (29.59 inHg)	Philippines	Minor	4	
Nida (Vinta)	November 21 – December 3	Violent typhoon	215 km/h (134 mph)	905 hPa (26.72 inHg)	Caroline Islands, Mariana Islands	Minor	None	
TD	November 24–25	Tropical depression	55 km/h (34 mph)	1,006 hPa (29.71 inHg)	Malaysia, Indonesia, Thailand	None	None	
28W	December 3–5	Tropical depression	45 km/h (28 mph)	1,000 hPa (29.53 inHg)	None	None	None	
TD	December 7–8	Tropical depression	45 km/h (28 mph)	1,008 hPa (29.77 inHg)	Philippines	None	None	
Season aggregates
41 systems	January 3 – December 8, 2009		215 km/h (134 mph)	905 hPa (26.72 inHg)		$11.8 billion	2,572	

== See also ==
- Tropical cyclones in 2009
- Pacific typhoon season
- 2009 Pacific hurricane season
- 2009 Atlantic hurricane season
- 2009 North Indian Ocean cyclone season
- South-West Indian Ocean cyclone seasons: 2008–09, 2009–10
- Australian region cyclone seasons: 2008–09, 2009–10
- South Pacific cyclone seasons: 2008–09, 2009–10
- Effects of the 2009 Pacific typhoon season in the Philippines
