= Effects of the 2013 Pacific typhoon season in the Philippines =

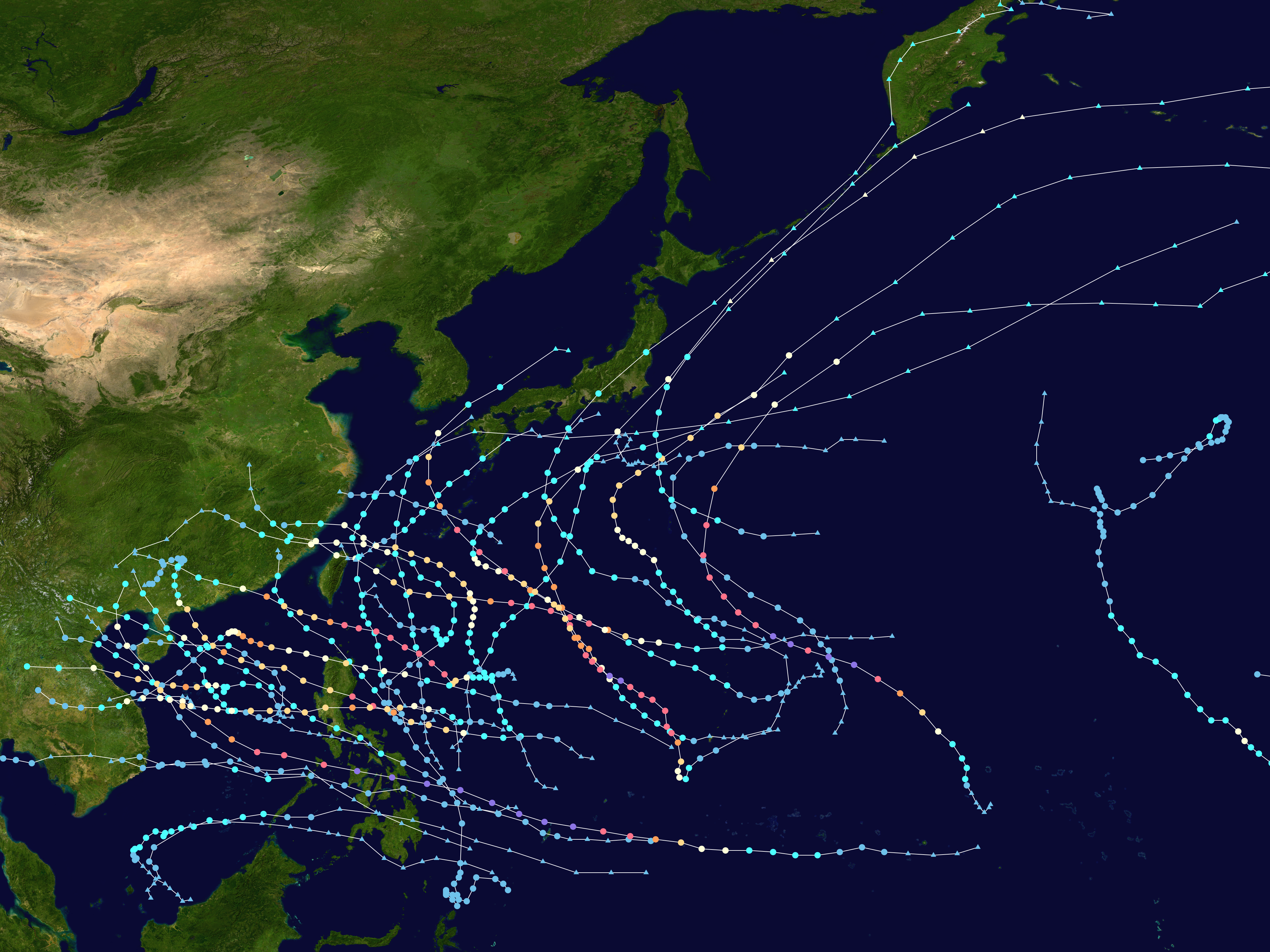
Tracks of all storms during the 2013 season

The effects of the 2013 Pacific typhoon season in the Philippines were considered some of the worst in decades. Throughout the year, a series of typhoons impacted the country, with the worst impacts coming from Typhoon Haiyan, especially in death toll, during November.

The first half of the season was relatively weak compared to the other intense seasons of 2004 and 2009. The season started off with Auring affecting southern Philippines on January 2. The next week after that, Bising formed consequently south of the country, which later moving off north becoming a bomb cyclone. After a month, Crising developed, tracking like Auring.

During the second half of the season, tropical activity within the Western Pacific rose especially on the month of August. A series of storms formed or entered the Philippine area of Responsibility during the first week of June until the middle of July, which brought heavy rainfall throughout the country. Tropical activity and the southwest monsoon gradually intensified after the dissipation of Tropical Depression Kiko, which Typhoon Labuyo made landfall over Luzon a few days after that. Even though Maring didn't made landfall whereabouts in the country, the system intensified the monsoon which brought extreme flooding throughout the country.

Even though September was weak, with Typhoon Odette impacting southern Taiwan and extreme northern Luzon, October was relatively active as well as dual typhoons appearing three times within the month. Just like Maring, Quedan enhanced the monsoon. The storm later intensified into a strong typhoon just in the upper part of the PAR, and later making landfall over eastern China with extreme damages. When Quedan was exiting the PAR, Ramil briefly entered their area while intensifying into a Category 4 typhoon. During the mid-week of the month, Typhoon Santi made landfall over central Luzon, with extreme damages. Category 5 Typhoon Francisco weakened to a minimal typhoon before entering their area with a codename of Urduja.

The last four named storms by PAGASA was from the last week of October until the mid-week of November. During late-October, Vinta made landfall over northern Luzon with little damages. As November came in, the PAGASA had monitored a weak Tropical Depression Wilma which had brought minor damages and a waterspout in southern Visayas. Later that week, Super Typhoon Yolanda (Haiyan) entered the area as a rapidly intensifying storm system with a fast-pace speed and was named Yolanda by PAGASA. The monstrous typhoon first made landfall over eastern Visayas with the JTWC unofficially estimating wind speeds of up to 305 km/h (190 mph). This made Haiyan the strongest storm globally to make landfall, in terms of 1-minute sustained wind speeds, until the record was broken by Super Typhoon Rolly (Goni) 7 years later. Upon impact, the storm produced a large storm surge, which was a primary cause for the abnormally high death toll of nearly 7,000 people Haiyan caused in the Philippines. Just like the formation of Bising during January, the last named storm, Zoraida, formed and impacted southern Philippines with hardly any deaths and damages. No storms formed after that from November through to the end of the year.

Moreover, this is the first time that PAGASA had used all 25 names in their list since 2004 which also marks one of a few active seasons.

== Seasonal statistics ==
Name	PAGASA name	Dates of impact	Dates within PAR	Fatalities	Damages (Millions US$)	Maximum intensity during passage
Sonamu	Auring	January 3–4	January 2–4	1	Minor	Tropical storm
----	Bising	January 11–13	January 11–13	0	0.034	Tropical Depression
Shanshan	Crising	February 18–20	February 18–20	4	0.255	Tropical Depression
Yagi	Dante	----	June 7–10	----	----	----
Leepi	Emong	June 16–18	June 16–20	0	Minor	Tropical storm
Bebinca	Fabian	----	June 20	----	----	----
Rumbia	Gorio	June 27–29	June 27–30	5	1.25	Tropical storm
Soulik	Huaning	----	July 10–13	----	----	----
Cimaron	Isang	July 15–17	July 15–18	2	Minimal	Tropical storm
Jebi	Jolina	July 30	July 30–31	0	Minor	Tropical Depression
Mangkhut	Kiko	----	August 5	----	----	----
Utor	Labuyo	August 10–12	August 9–13	11	32.431	Typhoon
Trami	Maring	August 17–19	August 16–21	27	15.441	Tropical storm
Kong-rey	Nando	August 25–27	August 25–29	3	Minimal	Tropical storm
Usagi	Odette	September 17–20	September 16–21	3	Major	Typhoon
Wutip	Paolo	----	September 26–27	----	----	----
Fitow	Quedan	----	September 29–October 5	----	----	----
Danas	Ramil	----	October 6–7	----	----	----
Nari	Santi	October 9–12	October 8–13	15	>69.4	Typhoon
Wipha	Tino	----	October 14–15	----	----	----
Francisco	Urduja	----	October 22–24	----	----	----
Krosa	Vinta	October 30–November 1	October 28–November 1	4	6.4	Typhoon
30W	Wilma	November 4	November 4–5	0	Minor	Tropical depression
Haiyan	Yolanda	November 6–8	November 6–9	6,300	2,051.71	Super Typhoon
Podul	Zoraida	November 10–13	November 10–13	2	Minimal	Tropical storm
----	25	January 3 – November 13	January 2 – November 13	6,377	> 2,176.921	----

== Seasonal activity ==
=== January–February ===
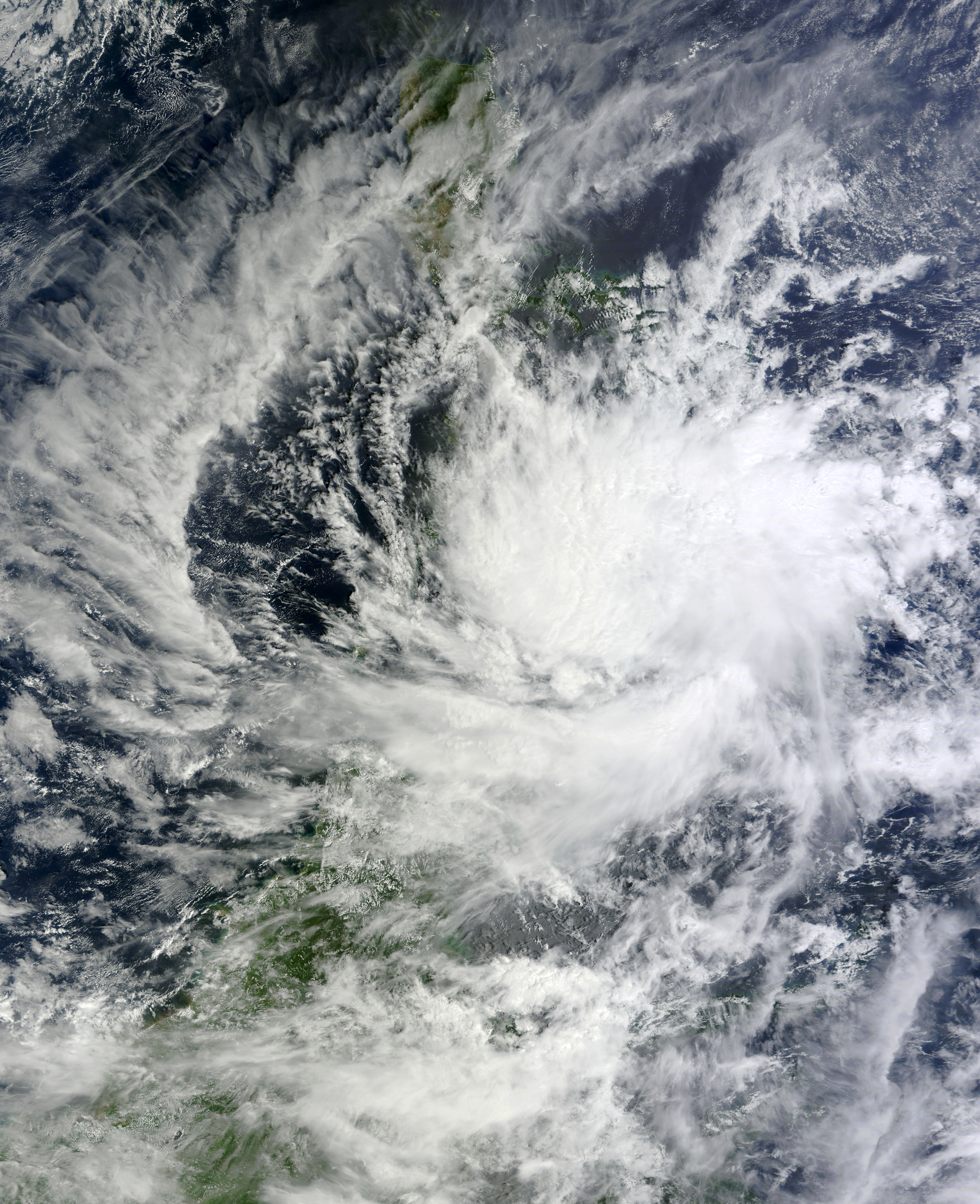
Newly formed Tropical Depression Crising, west of Mindanao

On January 3, the PAGASA had started to issue advisories on a tropical depression and west named Auring, as it was located over the Sulu Sea. Public Storm Signal #1 were raised over western Visayas including Palawan. Heavy flooding was observed throughout Mindanao. PAGASA had also stated in one of their bulletins that heavy rainfall would be an estimate of 5–15mm per hour. A passenger vessel ran aground on Thursday, after being hammered by strong winds and waves spawned by tropical depression Auring, but all 228 passengers were rescued unharmed over in Dumaguete. Within the Philippines, one person died, while a passenger ship was stranded near the coast of Dumaguete on January 3 before being rescued. PAGASA had issued their final warning, which was upgraded to Tropical Storm Auring, as it heads out of the Philippine area of Responsibility and was later upgraded by the Japan Meteorological Agency (JMA) to Tropical Storm Sonamu on January 4. By January 8, the NDRRMC confirmed that the total death toll rose to 2 and 12 were injured by Tropical Storm Auring. At least 63 houses were damages while 122 were destroyed. Damages from the storm are unknown, but the effects were minor.

On January 11, Tropical Depression Bising developed east of the Philippines. Bising caused moderate to heavy rains across Bicol Region, Eastern Visayas, Central Visayas and Mindanao. More than 17,000 people were affected by heavy rains caused by Bising. About 229 passengers were stranded in Bicol. The NDRRMC had reported that no casualties were confirmed and damages were estimated at PhP 1.5 million (US$34,000) due to Bising.

With Tropical Depression Crising, 100 families were evacuated as it headed to Palawan. Crising left several areas flooded, including areas that were hit by Typhoon Bopha last December 2012. NDRRRMC had also reported that 16,700 people were affected in southern Mindanao of Regions X and XI. A total of 262,880 people were affected throughout the country, nearly half in the Davao Region. The storm destroyed 53 homes and damaged 119 others, while crop damage amounted to ₱11.2 million (US$255,000). On February 20, classes in three cities in Cebu were suspended due to heavy rains. Heavy rains from the storm triggered flooding in the southern Philippines that killed four people and left two others missing by the NDRRMC on February 21. On February 22, it was confirmed that a total of at least 36,407 families were affected by Crising across Mindanao and Eastern Visayas, which 5,683 families are staying in evacuation centres.

=== June–July ===
Even though Yagi, known as Dante, didn't make landfall in any parts of the country, the storm enhanced the early southwest monsoon which brought heavy rainfall to parts of the Philippines. With this, the PAGASA had declared the official start of rainy season, which was on June 10. After a week and same with Yagi, Tropical Storm Leepi brought heavy rainfall throughout the country without making landfall. On June 18, PAGASA stated that Leepi may bring moderate to heavy rainfall with possible thunderstorms over southern Luzon, Visayas and northern Mindanao. Due to heavy rainfall from the precursor system, PAGASA issued a flash flood warning for parts of Mindanao as well. Heavy precipitation was reported in Davao City, as well as Greater Manila, where the Metropolitan Manila Development Authority offered free rides to stricken commuters. On June 20, the PAGASA had stated that Tropical Depression Fabian will have no direct to the country, but it will bring heavy rainfall over in western Luzon and Palawan and coastal waves will be moderate to rough over the western seaboards.

==== Tropical Storm Rumbia ====
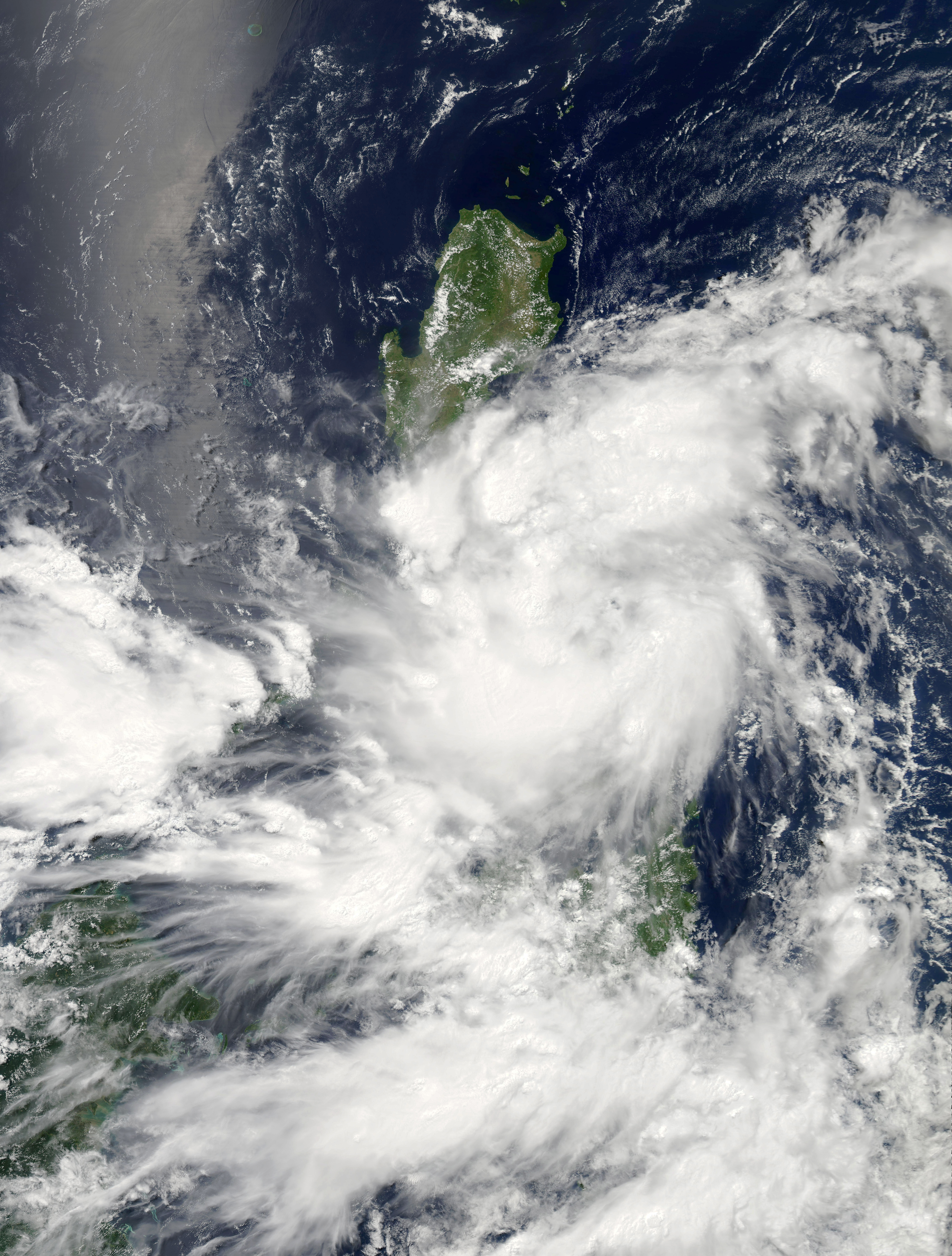
Tropical Storm Rumbia over the Philippines on June 29

Late on June 27, when PAGASA made their first few bulletins on Gorio, Public Storm Signal #1 has been raised mostly over Regions VIII and a few islands over XIII. The agency advised residents living in low-lying and mountainous areas under public storm warning signals to be alert against possible flash floods and landslides. On June 29, Gorio made landfall over eastern Samar. As the JMA upgraded Gorio to Tropical Storm Rumbia, Signal #2 were now put up over Region V and VIII, whilst Signal #1 were put up over southern Luzon, Visayas and northern Mindanao. PAGASA also upgraded Rumbia to a tropical storm. In Manila, the Metropolitan Manila Development Authority's (MMDA) Monsoon Task Force deployed 200 personnel to 11 station in the local metropolitan area to monitor flooding and traffic conditions, as well as assist in potential rescue situations. The authority also requested the dismantling of all outdoor advertisements and billboards. Army rescue trucks were also on standby in Guadalupe, Makati. The Philippine government allocated ₱6.9 million in relief funds to deal with the effects of Rumbia. The Department of Social Welfare and Development in Eastern Visayas activated rapid response teams and prepared 1,040 family food packs for potential delivery in disaster areas. The department also readied ₱263,920 in standby food funds and ₱1.7 million in food items, as well as ₱270,350 in standby non-food funds. The civil defense office in the province also called for the preemptive evacuation of citizens in potentially affected areas. Local disaster management units in Caraga were activated, with 2,000 family food packs readied and a standby fund totaling ₱300,440. In total, the cost of prepositioned food packs, standby funds, food items, and other relief materials in Eastern Visayas and Caraga amounted to ₱6.9 million.

Due to the heavy rainfall from Rumbia in Tacloban, local officials were forced to cancel the scheduled Day of Festivals Parade. Elsewhere in Leyte, the rains began to cause widespread flooding on June 29, which also contributed to the cancellation of the event. In Central Visayas, Southern Luzon, Bicol, Northern Mindanao, and Eastern Visayas, the storm displaced 10,604 passengers due to the stoppage of transportation services as a result of Rumbia. Two major roadways in Eastern Visayas were blocked by soil erosion and flooding left behind by the heavy rainfall. In Bicol, the Philippine Coast Guard suspended maritime operations, resulting in the displacement of at least 2,949 passengers. A minor landslide rendered a main road impassable, but cleanup crews subsequently removed the debris. In Northern and Eastern Samar, downed wires resulted in temporary and isolated power outages across the two provinces.

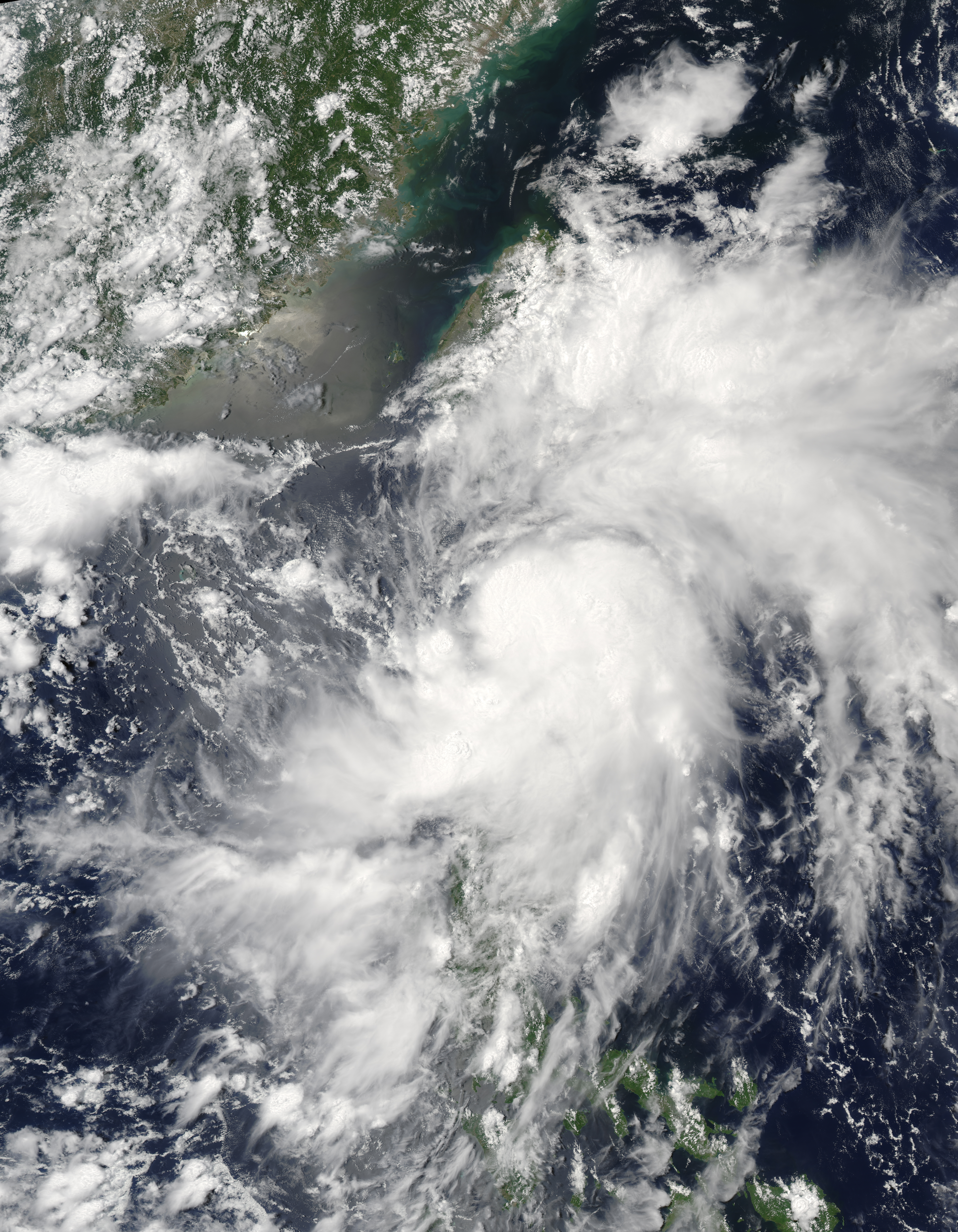
Tropical Storm Cimaron on July 17

Overall, on July 1, the NDRRMC had reported that seven people were left dead.

==== Tropical Storm Cimaron and Jebi ====
Tropical storm Isang enhanced the south-west monsoon and brought heavy rain to parts of Luzon and Visayas between July 16–18. It will enhance the southwest monsoon which will bring light to moderate rains and thunderstorms over Metro Manila and the rest of Luzon and Western Visayas, Pagasa said.

=== August ===
==== Typhoon Utor ====
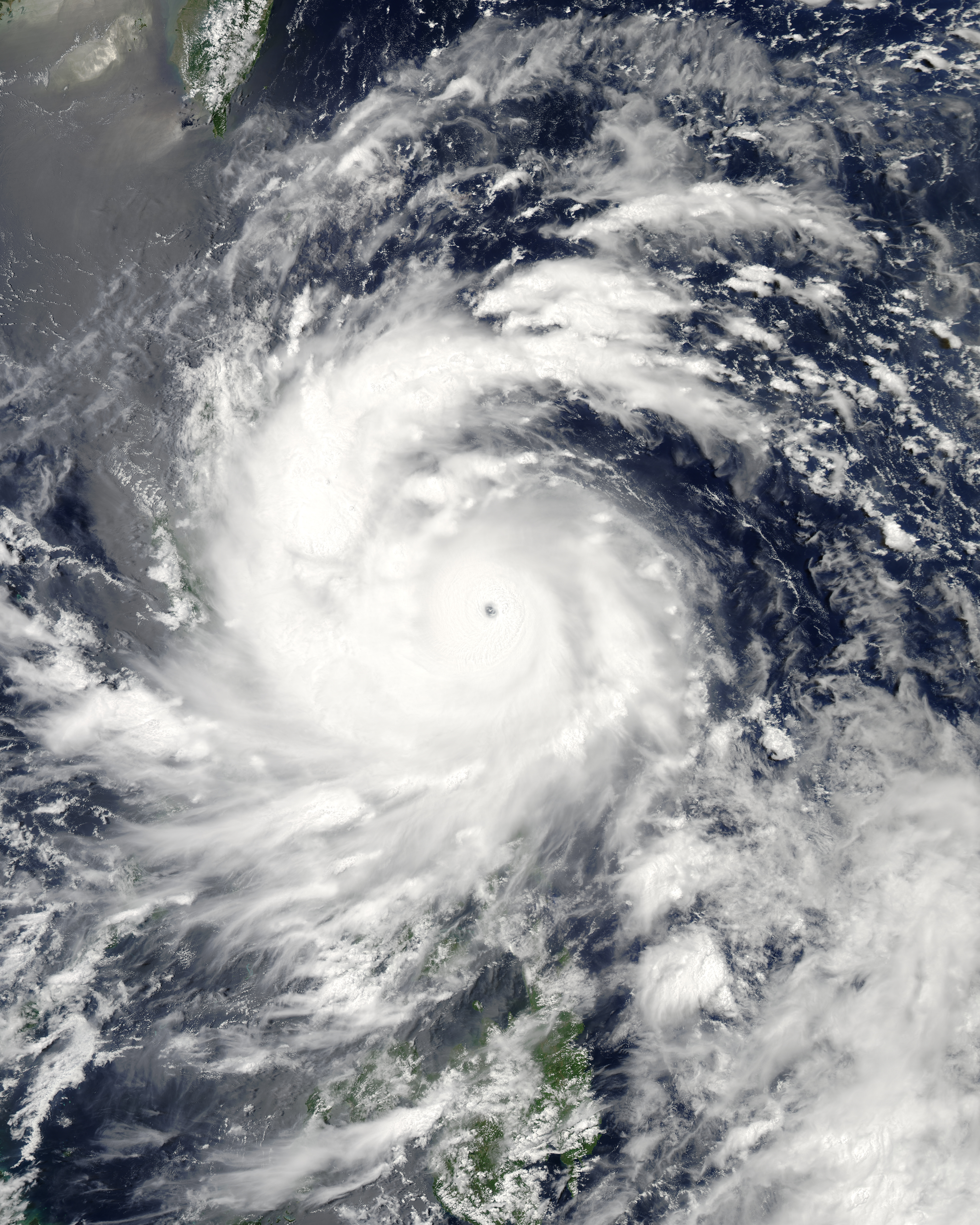
Utor making landfall over the Philippines at peak intensity

Ahead of Utor affecting the Philippines, PAGASA issued various tropical cyclone signals for Luzon and Visayas, including signal 3 for the provinces of Aurora and Isabela and signal 1 for Metro Manila. As Utor approached Central Luzon, a Malacanang Palace spokesperson called that local government to prepare and evacuate residents living near slopes, mountains and sea. Thirty-two provinces in Luzon and Manila had been placed under signal warnings. In Isabela, 67 families were evacuated before landfall. Under the anticipation of a direct hit, the local Pangasinan government placed the entire province on red alert. On August 11, the governor announced the suspension of classes from pre-school to tertiary level. Government and private offices were also suspended. Rescue equipment and rubber boats had also been placed in the disaster risk area of the province. In the said regions, the government advised all to not engage on water sports or rough seas due to the anticipated rough seas.

Utor made its landfall in Casiguran, Aurora at 3 AM (local time) on August 12. Power lines and telecommunications services went down, and many houses were destroyed. In Nueva Vizcaya, heavy rainfall had been recorded. Some residents in the said province were forced to evacuate due to flooding. Moreover, the Magat River in the province reached the critical level, resulting in the partial opening of four gates in a dam. Electricity was also out in the province. One man died on Baguio after he had been buried alive after a mudslide hit his home. In Isabela, more than 100 families had been affected by Utor. About 200 million pesos in agriculture was blamed on Utor in Isabela alone. Around 1,000 residents in the central Bicol region spent the night in shelters, and 23 fishermen who were out at sea failed to return home in four towns in Catanduanes province. Some cars in North Luzon Expressway used hazard signals as roads were nearly impossible to see. Intense rainfall throughout the day had been recorded in Zambales, which created flash flooding in low-lying areas. The major river on the province then overflowed, flooding homes. The flood is expected to get higher as high tide is expected in the morning. At least 700 passengers were stranded in the ports of Albay, Catanduanes, Sorsogon and Samar. Additionally, 10 flights had also been canceled as Utor brought intense rainfall in many parts of Luzon.

Throughout the Philippines, at least ten people were killed while four others were listed as missing. A total of 398,813 people were affected by the typhoon, roughly a third of whom were displaced from their homes. Significant infrastructural damage took place with 2,565 homes destroyed and 18,090 more damaged. Losses from Utor amounted to ₱1.08 billion (US$24.8 million), the majority resulting from agricultural damage.

==== Tropical Storm Trami and Kong-rey ====
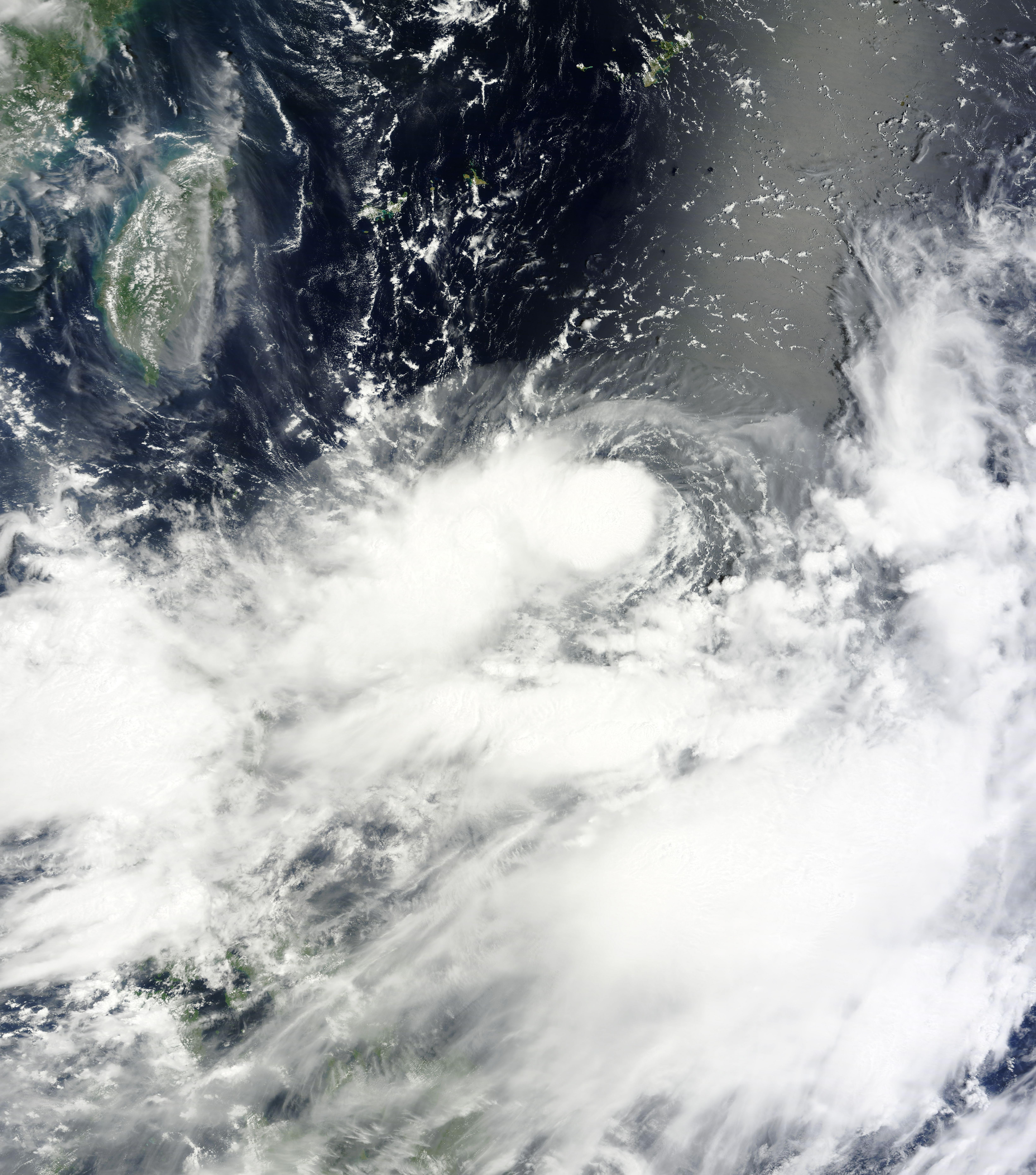
Tropical Storm Trami north of the Philippines on August 18

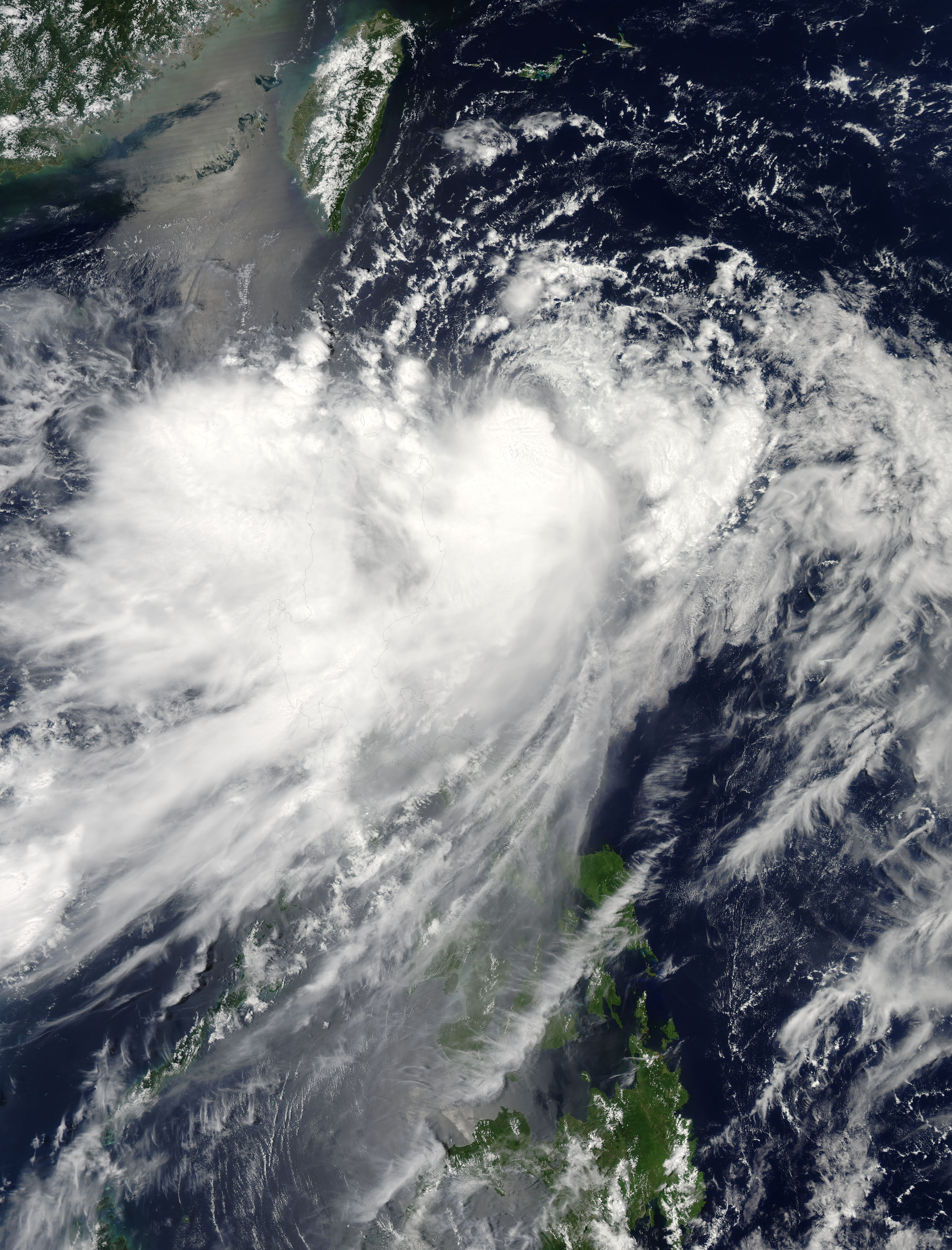
Tropical Storm Kong-rey east of the Philippines on August 27

Even though Trami did not cause landfall in the Philippines, the storm did enhance the southwest monsoon which brought extreme flooding throughout most of the country on August 18. Due to this, the government declares suspension of classes in some areas and PAGASA subsequently issued several rainfall advisories. Major areas in Metro Manila and nearby provinces reported severe flooding. The Marikina River as high as 19 meters, forcing authorities evacuate nearby residents. 8 people in the Philippines have been killed due to flooding. Monsoon rains are seen in Metro Manila, Regions I, IV-A, IV-B and V which may trigger flashfloods and landslides. The NDRRMC quickly mobilized units from the military and its reserves in response to critical areas being hit by rising floodwaters. Units from both MMDA and PNRC also responded to the call and pre-positioned its personnel along critical areas of Metro Manila. According to NDRRMC's last report on August 30, in total, Trami has caused P690 million (US$15.4 million) of damage and killed a total of 27 people, in which 30 injured and 4 missing.

Later, on August 25, PAGASA started issuing advisories on Tropical Depression Nando. Same with Trami, even it didn't made landfall, heavy rains produced by the storm caused flooding over northern Philippines. As JMA upgraded it to Tropical Storm Kong-rey on August 27, Signal #2 were raised over extreme northern Luzon including Apayao. PAGASA had also added that Kong-rey may bring heavy to intense rainfall of 10 — 25mm per hour in its 400 km diameter. The rest of Luzon will be experiencing light to moderate rains of 5 — 10mm per hour with isolated thunderstorms, due to the intense monsoon. Damages from Kong-rey over the Philippines were minimal but fatalities were confirmed as 1.

=== September ===
Early on September 17, PAGASA issued the public storm warning signal number 1 for Cagayan, Calayan and the Babuyan island groups, however these were lifted later that day as Usagi was expected to remain almost stationary for 24 – 36 hours. PAGASA subsequently reissued warning signal number 1 for Cagayan, Calayan, Isabela and the Babuyan island group, during the next day after the system became a typhoon and started moving again. Early the next day as the system intensified further Signal 1 and 2 were hoisted for 7 and 5 areas respectively. Later that day as Usagi approached Northern Luzon and the JTWC reported that the system had become a super typhoon signal 4 was raised for the Batanes island group while signal 3 was hoisted for the Calayan and Babuyan Island groups and various other areas were placed under signals 1 and 2.

=== October ===
October was the busiest month for typhoons over the Western Pacific, with six of them entering the Philippine Area of Responsibility, although most of the typhoons brushed past the northern part of the area without making any effects over the country.

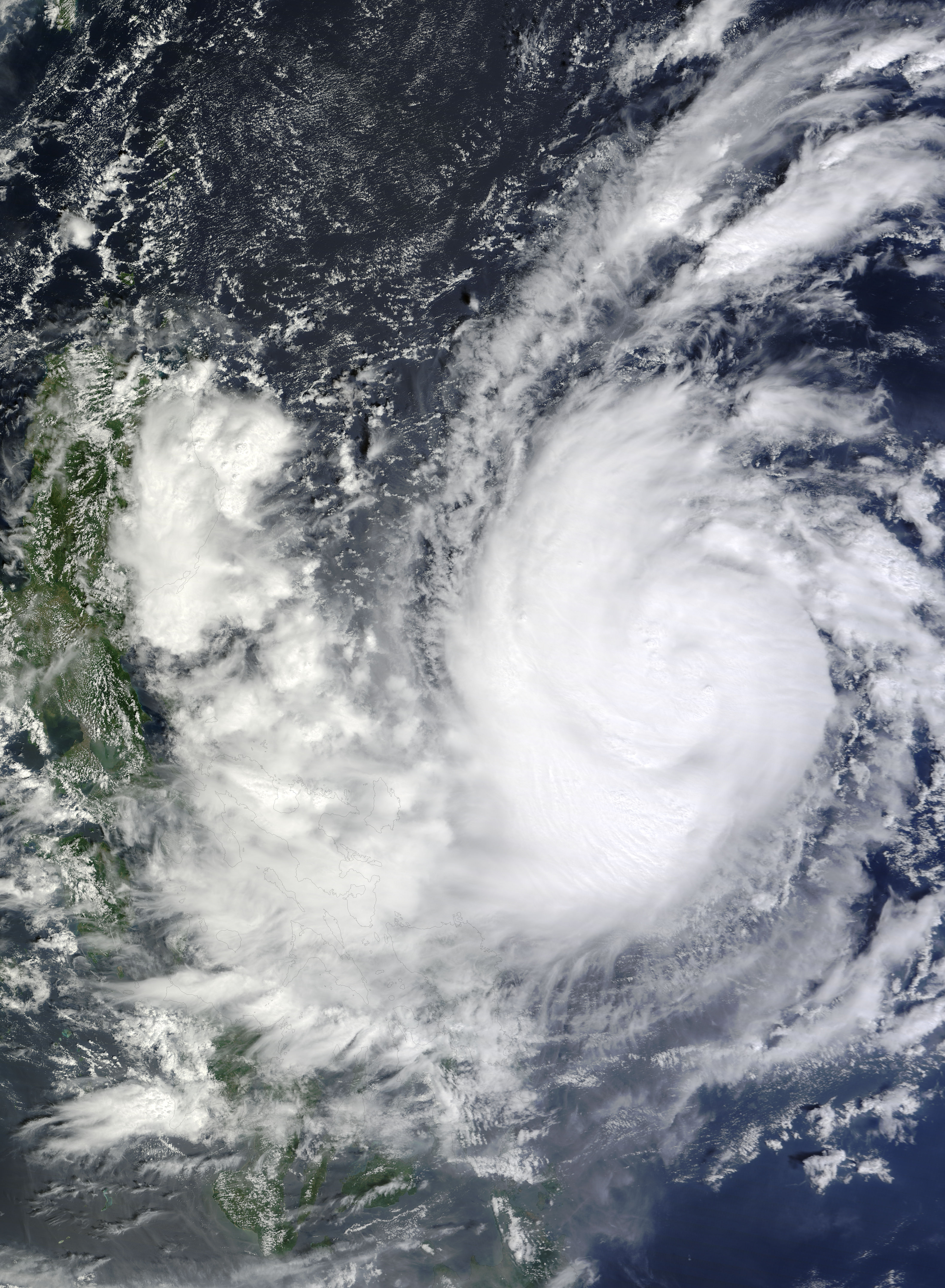
Tropical Storm Nari approaching the Philippines on October 10

During October 9, PAGASA issued Public Storm Warning Signal #1 for the island province of Catanduanes, before expanding the areas under Signal 1 early the next day to include Aurora, Camarines Norte, Camarines Sur, Isabela, the Polillo Islands and Quezon due to the incoming and intensifying Typhoon Nari, or Typhoon Santi. Later that day after the system had intensified into a typhoon and accelerated slightly towards the Philippines slightly, PAGASA placed 17 areas in Luzon under Signal #1, 14 areas under Signal #2 and Aurora Province under Signal #3. During October 11, the areas under signal 3 were expanded to include Benguet, Ifugao, Ilocos Sur, Isabela, La Union, Pangasinan, Polillo Island, Quirino, Nueva Ecija and Tarlac. Over the next day, the warnings were gradually revised before they were all subsequently cancelled during October 12, as the system moved out of the Philippine Area of Responsibility and was moving towards Vietnam. Within the Philippines a total of 15 people were left dead while 5 were missing from Typhoon Nari.

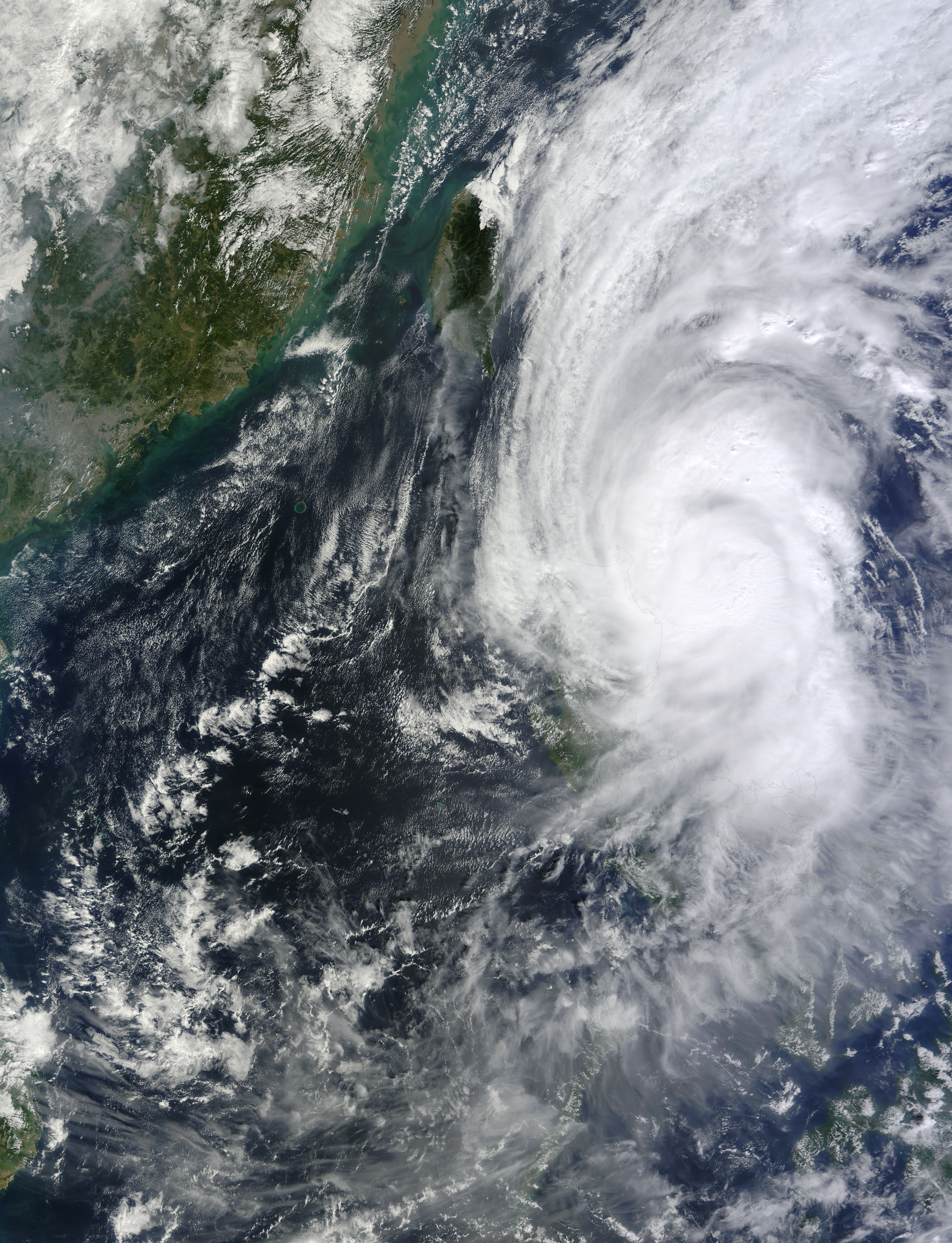
Krosa intensifying as it approaches the Philippines

Before Krosa (Vinta) struck the Philippines, PAGASA issued Signal #3 for portions of northern Luzon, where winds were expected to reach over 100 km/h (62 mph). The agency noted for the potential for flooding and landslides. High winds knocked down trees across Luzon, and left about 80% of Cagayan province without power, as well as some areas without internet or cellphone service. Portions of the Pan-Philippine Highway were blocked, and in Lal-Lo, Cagayan, a car crashed into a gasoline truck due to power outages. Agriculture damage was estimated at P273 million (PHP, $6.3 million USD), (Note: The total was originally reported in Philippine pesos. Total converted via the Oanda Corporation website.) occurring just before the start of the harvest. Across the island, the typhoon damaged 32,745 houses, including 3,837 that were destroyed, forcing 65,648 people to evacuate to storm shelters. Overall, Krosa killed four people in the Philippines, and left P273 million (PHP, US$6.4 million) in damage. After the storm, workers quickly restored power lines, while the government provided monetary assistance to storm-ravaged families, after Cagayan was declared a state of calamity. Members of the Philippine military and Department of Public Works and Highways worked to clean up following the storm.

=== November ===
Tropical Depression Wilma did not cause fatalities in the Philippines, but it still damaged houses and brought flooding. In Bohol, 83 houses and a wooden bridge were damaged, as well as several towns were flooded. Wilma also caused flooding in Palawan, leading to the evacuation of 146 families. Two bridges collapsed due to the flooding, and a further two provincial bridges made impassable. When Wilma made landfall, 4,355 passengers were stranded in seaports in Visayas, as well as 352 passengers were stranded in Manila. On November 4, Wilma weakened to a low-pressure area and also spawned a waterspout that caused minor damage in Bohol.

==== Typhoon Haiyan ====
Typhoon Haiyan, called typhoon "Yolanda" in the Philippines, caused catastrophic damage throughout much of the islands of Leyte, where cities and towns were largely destroyed. As of April 17, the National Disaster Risk Reduction and Management Council (NDRRMC) confirmed 6,300 fatalities across the country, 5,877 of those taking place in the Eastern Visayas. The actual death toll remains unclear, being claimed to be at least 10,000 by the victims from Tacloban City, Leyte alone. The total loss of life is estimated to be as low as 2,500 by President Benigno Aquino III. As of November 13, Red Cross estimated that 22,000 people were missing while approximately 65,500 people were listed as such through Google Person Finder. Google, however, cautioned that this value is not to be read into, as shown during the 2011 Tōhoku earthquake and tsunami when more than 600,000 names were listed in contrast to the final death toll of roughly 20,000.

In Surigao City, 281.9 mm (11.10 in) of rainfall was recorded, much of which fell in under 12 hours. Storm surges were also recorded in many places. In the island of Leyte and Samar, PAGASA measured 5–6 meters (16–20 ft) waves. In Tacloban, Leyte, the terminal building of Tacloban Airport was destroyed by a 5.2 m (17 ft) storm surge up to the height of the second story. Along the airport, a storm surge of 4 m (13 ft) was estimated. Waves of 4.6 m (15 ft) were also estimated. On the western coast of Samar, the storm surge was not as significant.

Animated enhanced infrared satellite loop of Typhoon Haiyan from peak intensity to landfall in the Philippines

Guiuan in Eastern Samar was the point of Haiyan's first landfall, and was severely affected due to the typhoon's impacts. Nearly all structures in the township suffered at least partial damage, many of which were completely flattened. For several days following Haiyan's first landfall, the damage situation in the fishing town remained unclear due to lack of communication. However, the damage could finally be assessed after Philippine Air Force staff arrived in Guiuan on November 10.

There was widespread devastation from the storm surge in Tacloban City especially in San Jose, with many buildings being destroyed, trees knocked over or broken, and cars piled up. The low-lying areas on the eastern side of Tacloban city were hardest hit, with some areas completely washed away. Flooding also extended for 1 km (0.62 mi) inland on the east coast of the province. City administrator Tecson John Lim stated that roughly 90 percent of the city had been destroyed. Journalists on the ground have described the devastation as, "off the scale, and apocalyptic". Most families in Samar and Leyte lost some family members or relatives; families came in from outlying provinces looking for relatives, especially children, who may have been washed away. The entire first floor of the Tacloban City Convention Center, which was serving as an evacuation shelter, was submerged by storm surge. Many residents in the building were caught off-guard by the fast rising waters and subsequently drowned or were injured in the building. There is also a cultural view in the country that swimming in a typhoon's storm surge is considered to be a brave way to survive, which mostly contributed to the large death toll.

Although wind speeds were extreme, the major cause of damage and loss of life appears to have been storm surge. The major focus of devastation appears to have been on the east coast of Samar and Leyte, with a particular focus on Tacloban, because of its location between Samar and Leyte, and the large population in low-lying areas.

There is little communication in the city, and no mobile phone coverage. Up the east coast of the Leyte there are numerous towns and villages that are completely cut off without any assistance. Large parts of Leyte and Samar are without power and may have no power for a month.

The storm crossed the Visayas region for almost a day, causing widespread flooding. In Cebu and Bohol, struck by a magnitude 7.2 earthquake two weeks before, cities were also severely devastated. During the morning of November 8, media stations across the country were able to broadcast live the destruction of Haiyan. However, before afternoon, all communications on the Visayas region failed. The Presidential Communications Department of President Benigno Aquino III had difficulty contacting DILG Secretary Mar Roxas and Defense Secretary Voltaire Gazmin in Tacloban City to plan relief. Widespread power interruptions, landslides and flash floods were also reported. Major roads were blocked by trees, and impassable. 453 domestic and international airline flights were canceled. Some airports were also closed on November 8 and 9. Ferries were affected. Relief and rescue efforts were underway by November 9, but some places remained isolated and out of communication due to severe damage.

According to NDRRMC on their last update on April 17, 2014, total damages were confirmed ₱89.6 billion (US$2.05 billion). Casualties were confirmed at 36,050 people, with 6,300 of them dead and 28,689 of them injured by Haiyan and most of them in Eastern Visayas.

==== Tropical Depression Zoraida ====
Late on November 10, as Zoraida moved into the Philippine area of responsibility, PAGASA issued the Public Storm Warning Signal Number 1 for seven areas in Mindanao, indicating the potential for winds between 30–60 km/h (20–35 mph). Over the next day these warnings were extended to cover three provinces in Luzon, eight provinces in Visayas and twenty-one provinces in Mindanao. On Cebu Island, officials ordered schools to close during the storm's passage. After the extreme damage due to Typhoon Haiyan in the Philippines, the depression that became Podul affected the same areas just days later, which affected rescue work. The depression caused additional difficulties in travel and communications. In addition to causing a landslide in Monkayo, flooding from the depression covered roads and forced about 1,000 families to evacuate. In Davao del Norte, the depression resulted in river flooding that killed two people. Zoraida later moved out of their area of responsibility on November 12, when it intensified into Tropical Storm Podul two days later.

== Aftermath ==
During the end of 2013, PAGASA had announced that the names Labuyo, Santi and Yolanda will be retired after causing damages well over P1 billion and death toll exceeding over 300. PAGASA, early in 2014, updated their naming list and replaced the retired names by Lannie, Salome and Yasmin for the 2017 season.

== See also ==
- Typhoon
- Typhoons in the Philippines
- 2013 Pacific typhoon season
- Effects of the 2009 Pacific typhoon season in the Philippines
