= Effects of the 2009 Pacific typhoon season in the Philippines =

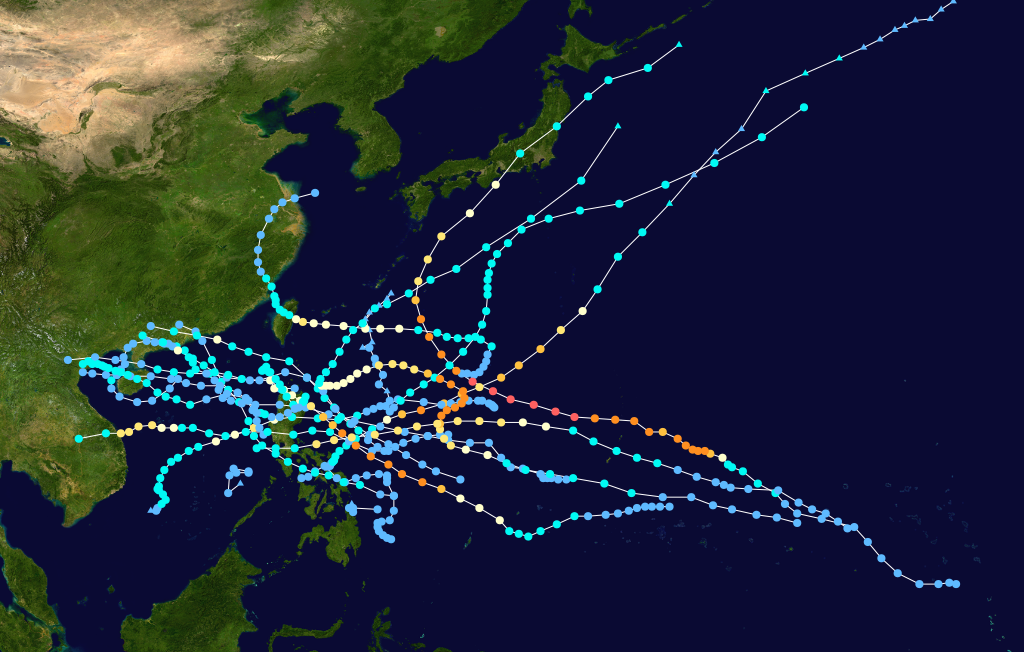
Tracks of all storms affecting the Philippines in 2009

The effects of the 2009 Pacific typhoon season in the Philippines were considered some of the worst in decades. Throughout the year, series of typhoons impacted the country, with the worst damage occurring during September and October from Typhoons Ketsana (Ondoy) and Parma (Pepeng).

The season started by the formation of Tropical Depression Auring during early part of the year which affected southern Philippines with moderate damages. Only two storms, Bising and Crising, developed during the weak first third of the season, with later Dante and Emong forming and impacting Luzon during the first week of May. Tropical Storm Feria impacted most of the country with severe damages during June. A series of weak storms developed continuously during July.

Typhoon Kiko only brushed the northern part of the Philippine's area of Responsibility while enhancing the southwest monsoon, which caused heavy flooding throughout the country. During late-September, combined with the enhancement of the monsoon, Ondoy formed and affected most of the country with an extreme death toll and extensive damages. Typhoons Pepeng and Quedan formed along a week after Ondoy, but both typhoons interacted together which made Pepeng affect northern Luzon for a long time. During late-October to early-November, Typhoon Santi made landfall over central Luzon with major damage. Vinta was the last storm to enter or form within the PAR during the season without even affecting the country.

== Seasonal statistics ==
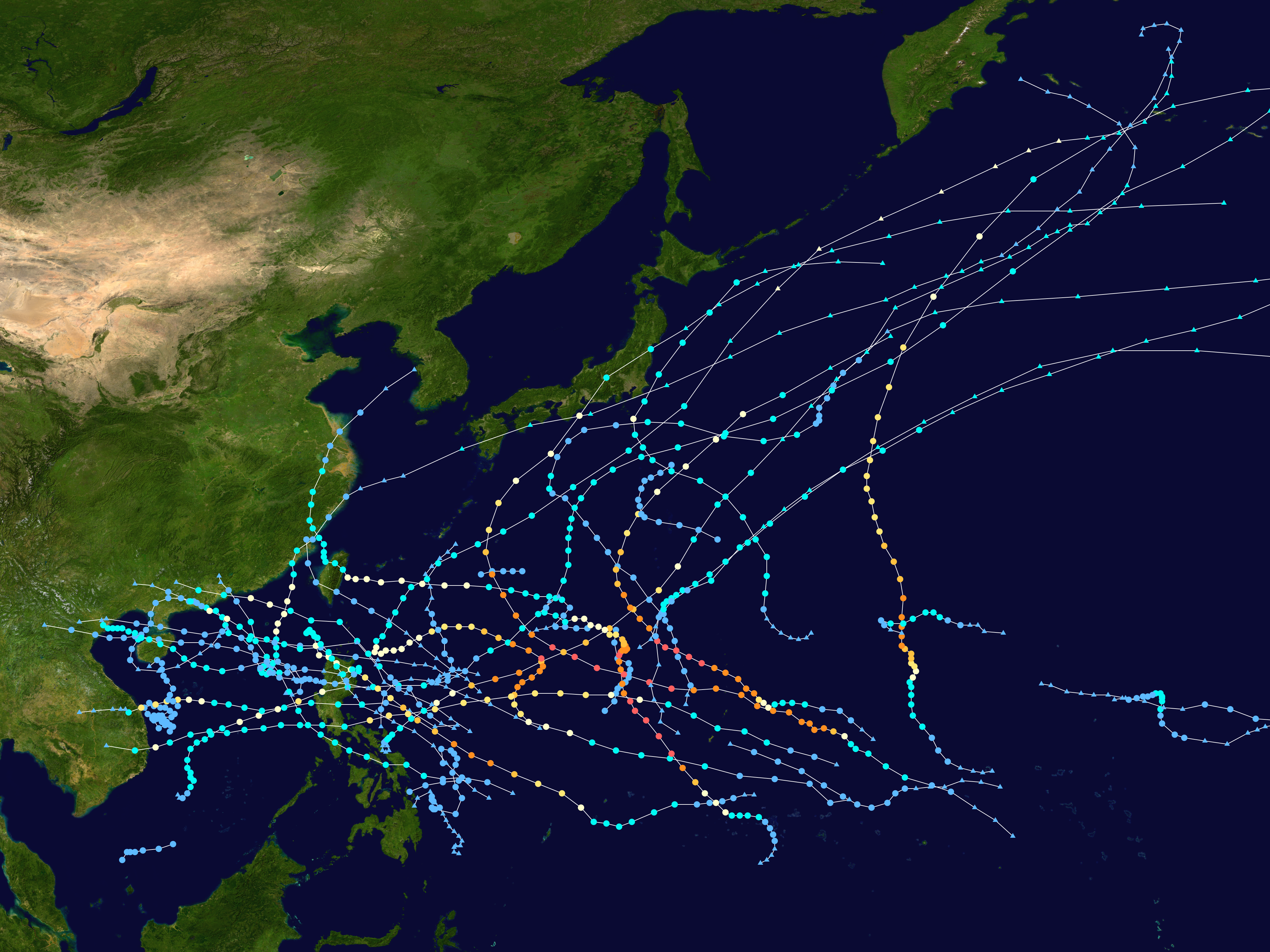
Tracks of all tropical cyclones in the western Pacific basin during 2009

Name	PAGASA name	Dates of impact	Fatalities	Damages (Millions US$)	Maximum intensity during passage
----	Auring	January 4–7	2	0.498	Tropical Depression
----	Bising	February 12–13	0	Minimal	Tropical Depression
----	Crising	May 1	0	Minimal	Tropical Depression
Kujira	Dante	May 1–3	28	27	Tropical Storm
Chan-hom	Emong	May 6–9	61	26.1	Typhoon
Nangka	Feria	June 23–25	11	0.054	Tropical Storm
Soudelor	Gorio	July 9–10	2	Minimal	Tropical Depression
06W	Huaning	----	----	----	----
Molave	Isang	July 14–17	4	Minimal	Tropical Depression
Goni	Jolina	July 30 – August 2	12	2.7	Tropical Depression
Morakot	Kiko	August 4–7	26	18.3	Typhoon
Dujuan	Labuyo	September 2–4	1	Minimal	Tropical Storm
Mujigae	Maring	September 8–10	13	6.4	Tropical Depression
Koppu	Nando	September 12–13	3	Minimal	Tropical Depression
Ketsana	Ondoy	September 23–26	464	233.1	Tropical Storm
Parma	Pepeng	October 1–11	465	570.7	Typhoon
Melor	Quedan	----	----	----	----
Lupit	Ramil	October 22–23	0	Minimal	Typhoon
Mirinae	Santi	October 30–31	29	10.4	Typhoon
24W	Tino	----	----	----	----
27W	Urduja	November 23–25	----	----	Tropical Depression
Nida	Vinta	----	----	----	----
----	20	January 5 – December 3	1124	903.139	----

== Seasonal activity ==
=== January–April ===
Tropical Depression Auring, the first system to form in the western Pacific during 2009, produced heavy rainfall and flooding on Mindanao in early January, forcing 38,764 people to evacuate to shelters from their homes. The flooding destroyed 294 houses, killed two people, and left nine others missing. About 12,211 people were left stranded at ports due to dangerous conditions caused by the depression. An additional 14 trucks, 44 light cars, 75 passenger buses, 27 vessels and 295 rolling cargoes were also stranded. A total of 305 homes were destroyed and another 610 were damaged. In addition, an estimated 53 hectares (130.9 acres) of rice and 3.5 hectares (8.6 acres) of corn were damaged. About 43,851 people were affected by the depression and damages from the depression were estimated at PHP 23 million ($494,000 US$).

Late on February 14, the remnants of Tropical Depression Bising brought scattered rainshowers across Southern Luzon, Bicol Region, and Visayas, then dissipated. The rainfall led to mudslides on Cebu Island which blocked the Cebu Transcentral Highway. Heavy rains produced by the outer bands of Tropical Depression Crising caused flooding in western areas of the Philippines, affecting an estimated 2,500 people. The worst flooding occurred in Lucena City where ten villages were isolated. Areas along the Bucon and Inalmasinan Rivers were inundated and sustained significant crop losses. Several animals reportedly drowned in the region. Several roads were impassable due to landslides or were washed out by floodwaters. One bridge was destroyed in the town of Mercedes.

=== May ===
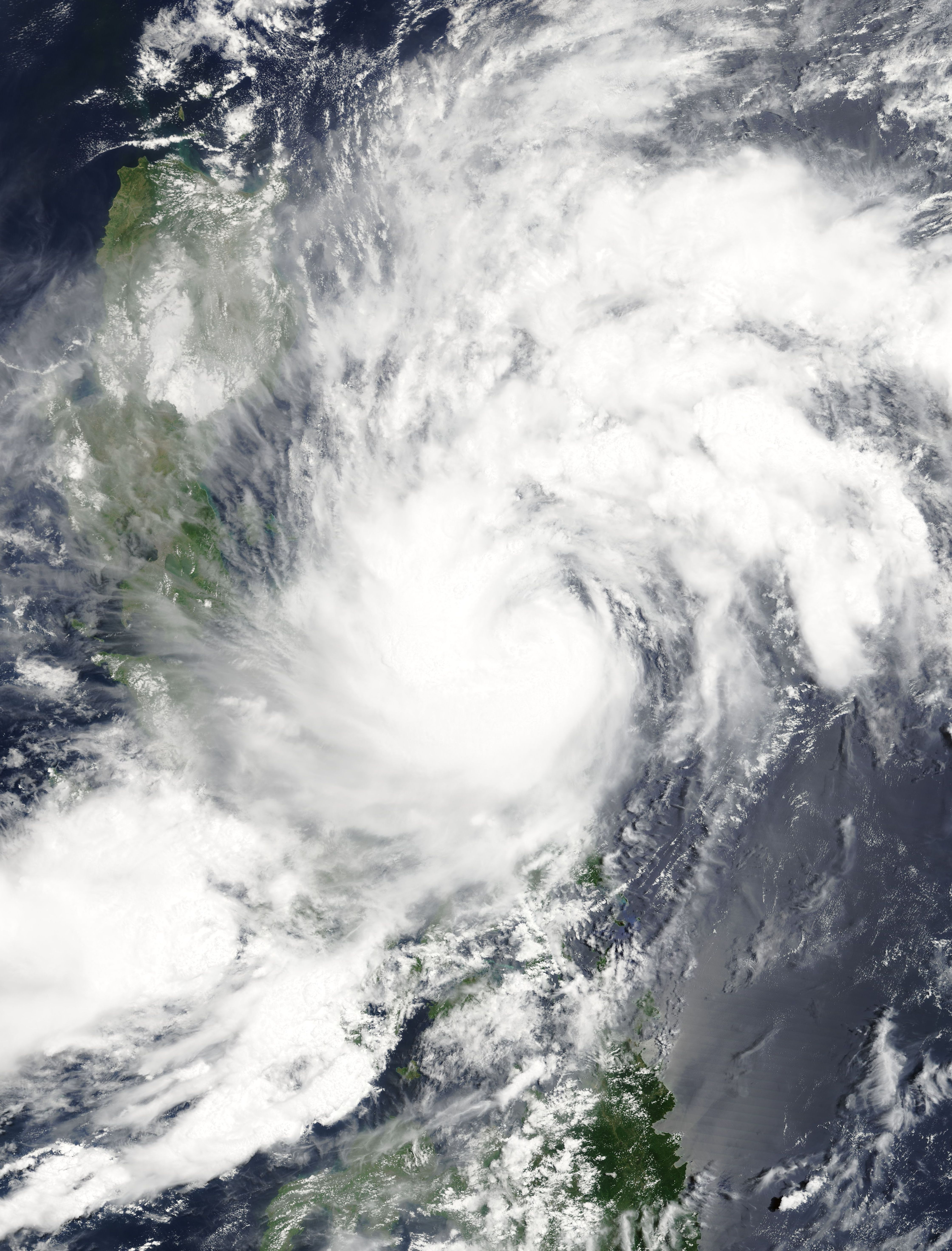
Tropical Storm Kujira near the Philippines on May 3

While in the Philippine area of responsibility, Typhoon Kujira caused some 625,709,464 worth of damage to crops and livestock in Albay, Camarines Norte, Masbate and Sorsogon. It also caused some 102 million pesos worth of damage to communal irrigation systems in the region. The NDCC update as of 6 am PST May 12 declared 28 dead, one missing and 5 injured. Further, 383,457 persons in 609 barangays of 60 municipalities and 4 cities in 5 provinces of Region V were affected by the storm. Damages are worth PhP 1,228,422,344 million or PhP1.228 billion of which PhP 625,709,464 are agricultural losses and PhP 529.525 million in infrastructural. Houses destroyed were at 2387, of which 138 were total and 2249 partial.

==== Typhoon Chan-hom (Emong) ====
A 48-hour rainfall was recorded throughout Luzon from May 6 to 8 peaking on May due to Typhoon Chan-hom. 7 Winds of 85–140 km/h combined with heavy rain damaged the provinces of Abra, Quirino, Cagayan, Apayao, Ilocos Norte, Aurora (further, these provinces received more than 200mm in 24 hours.) and Zambales (received more than 135 mm in 24 hours). Rain was also heavy over Pampanga (receiving 145 mm), Nueva Ecija, Tarlac, Bulacan, Bataan, Metro Manila and parts of southern Luzon. Moderate rain was also experienced over Quezon province and Bicol Region. (Cagayan and Isabela are not specified but are also flooded which can mean it may have experienced more than 50 mm of rain. Moreover, Cagayan River flooded). As of May 10, about 65,000 people were left homeless in Ilocos Region and in Cordillera region.

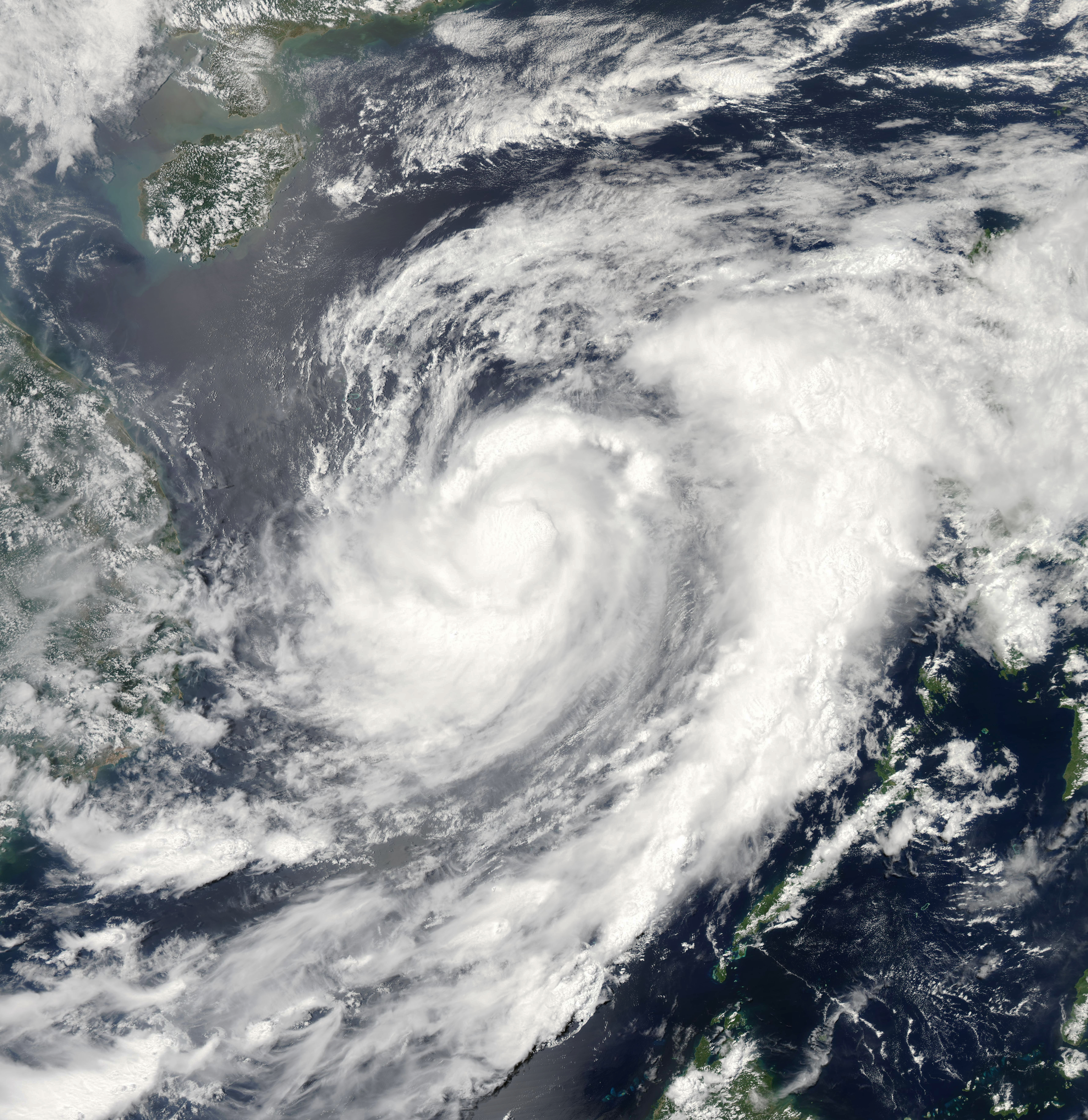
Typhoon Chan-hom near the Philippines on May 6

In Bataan, the flood was up to the waist level. Some residents were also evacuated. As of May 8, at least 25 people were confirmed to have been killed by flooding and mudslides produced by Emong. Chan-hom further affected 4,000 people, caused 11 landslides, cost PHP863,528 worth of crops in 55 hectares of land in Zambales and PHP4.4 million worth of transmission lines in Pangasinan.

On May 9, the number of fatalities increased to 26. Western Pangasinan was put under a state of calamity, with the whole province registering at least 16 deaths. Deaths included those who drowned, buried under their collapsed homes and got hit by flying debris. In the town of Anda in Pangasinan, "90 percent" of houses got their roofs blown away, with mango trees uprooted and cultured fishes washed away to the sea. In Ifugao, at least 10 deaths were blamed on landslides, while the bridges linking Lamut and Bagabag, Nueva Vizcaya collapsed. In Isabela, "all work animals" in San Mateo drowned when the town river overflowed.

The National Disaster Coordinating Council (NDCC) damage report update on 6:00 pm May 19 put dead at 60, injured at 53 and missing at 13 and damage worth 1,280,897,383 pesos of which 750,403,562 were in agriculture and 530,493,821 in infrastructure. It further affected 385,833 persons living in 615 barangays of 59 municipalities and 7 cities of 12 provinces of Region I (La Union and Pangasinan), Region II (Nueva Vizcaya, Isabela, Quirino and Cagayan), Region III (Zambales and Pampanga) and Cordillera Administrative Region (Ifugao, Kalinga, Mountain Province and Benguet) as well as damaged 56,160 houses of which 23,444 are totally destroyed and 32,716 partially damaged, and induced 11 landslides in Zambales and Ifugao.

=== June–July ===
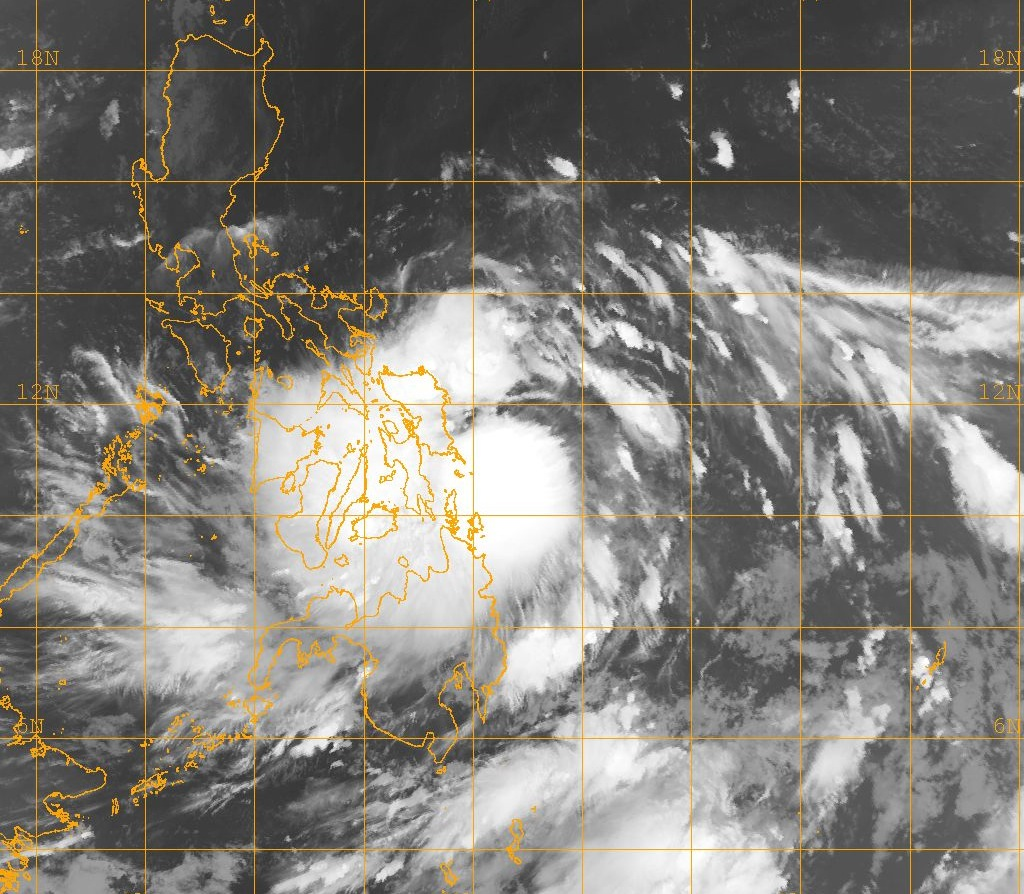
Tropical Storm Nangka approaching the Philippines on June 23

In Eastern Samar, Tropical Storm Nangka left more than 800 people stranded after ferry service was canceled. High winds downed a large tree, destroying the roof of one home and damaging three cars. Unusually strong severe thunderstorms developed over parts of the Philippines along the outer bands of Nangka. In San Pascual, Bauan and Batangas City, large hail fell during a strong storm. Residents reported that they have never seen hail before. In Barangay, 4 in Bauan town, a rare tornado struck, downing several trees, damaging homes and signs. Heavy rains produced by the storm also flooded numerous regions, some reporting waist-deep water. Later reports confirmed the tornado destroyed 23 homes. In Cebu, one person was killed and seven were left missing. At least 500 people were also left homeless due to the storm. In Cavite, 7000 were stranded on the port due to Nangka's winds and heavy rains. about 4 feet (1.2 m) is the water wave in Cavite. In Albay, more than 300 ship passengers were also stranded at the Albay port, Tabaco, Albay. In Navotas and Malabon, the Navotas – Malabon river produced a 3-foot (0.91 m) high tide in the area.

As of June 24, Nangka (Feria) has caused 6 deaths and left 11 people missing. Property damage from the storm is estimated at PHP 2.8 million (US$54,000).

In response to Tropical Storm Soudelor, the Philippine Atmospheric, Geophysical and Astronomical Services Administration issued public storm signal one for nine regions of the northern Philippines. As a tropical depression, Soudelor brushed northern Luzon in the Philippines, producing upwards of 330 mm (13 in) of rainfall which resulted in flash flooding and landslides. In Ilocos Norte, major roadways were completely blocked by high waters. The storm affected 19,845 people throughout the Philippines and one person was killed after being swept away by a fast current. At least ten villages were flooded during the storm. Three homes were destroyed and two more were damaged by Soudelor. A total of 42 barangays were flooded by the storm, killing 21 cows and isolating low-lying areas. On July 10, a battalion from the army engineers were deployed to the affected region to repair infrastructure. Following the storm, the hardest hit town Bacarra, Ilocos Norte, was put under a state of calamity and regional aid was deployed to the area.

In the Philippines Goni (Jolina) death toll is 8 with 5 more missing. Goni (Jolina) affected 38,589 families or 160,038 people in 119 villages in 25 towns and five cities in Ilocos Sur, Batangas, Cagayan, Nueva Ecija, Rizal, Mindoro Occidental, Palawan, Iloilo, Negros Occidental, Lanao del Sur, and Sultan Kudarat town in Maguindanao.

=== August ===
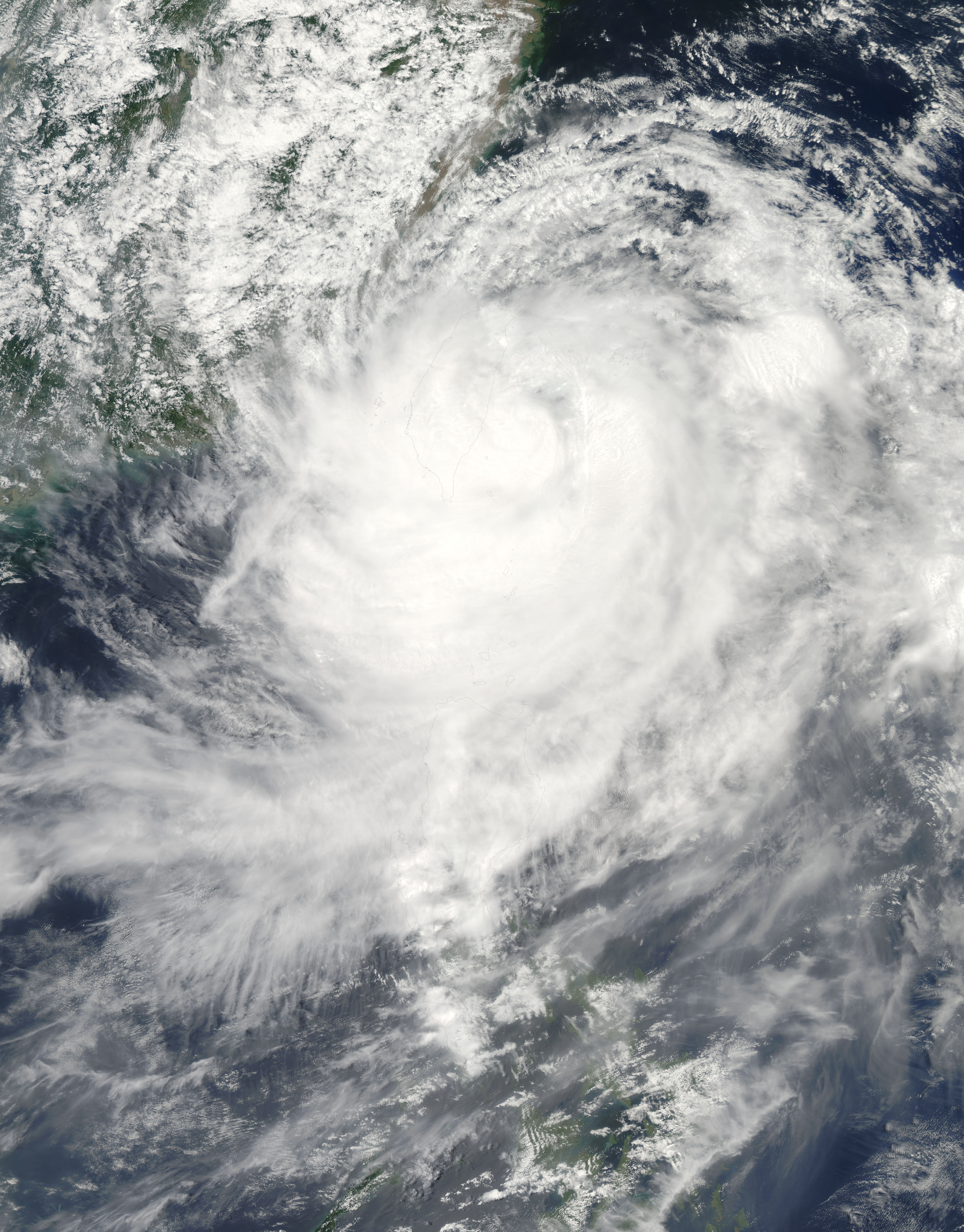
Typhoon Morakot north of the Philippines on August 7

Typhoon Morakot, also known as Kiko, produced severe flooding in parts of the Philippines that left 26 people dead. In the Philippines, ten villages (Paudpod, San Juan, Batonloc, Carael, Tampo, Paco, San Miguel, Bining, Bangan, and Capayawan) have been submerged in 4-to-5-foot-deep (1.2 to 1.5 m) floods after the Pinatubo Dike overflowed. Joint military and police rescue teams rescued 3 Koreans and 9 Canadian nationals. About 30,000 families were affected by Morakot; eleven people are confirmed dead. Three French tourists and two Filipino guides were killed in a flashflood caused by a landslide. Thousands are trapped on rooftops or in trees awaiting helicopter rescue attempts and thousands have lost their homes. At least two have died from flooding. Landslides have claimed the lives of two children and five miners are still missing after a landslide destroyed their huts. Schools have suspended their classes in the hardest hit area, and highways have been closed due to landslides.

In western Luzon including Manila, a 48-hour rainfall were recorded upon the formation of Tropical Storm Mujigae as a depression. The depression enhanced the southwest monsoon that brought torrential rains in the area. In Laguna, two children were killed due to landslides caused by torrential rains brought by Maring. Late on September 8, both the JMA and the PAGASA declared the system was a minor tropical depression. Also, on September 9, all classes in Manila was suspended from Pre – school, Elementary school, and High school due to incessant raining and flooding. The National Disaster Coordinating Council reported that at least three villages in Malabon were submerged in 18-inch-deep (460 mm) floodwaters. At least four streets in the area were impassable to light vehicles. Also on that day, six provinces was raised in public storm signal no. 1.

In Valenzuela City, 15 low-lying barangays located in the city's first district are underwater. In Bulacan, five towns and two cities of the province are flooded, with water as high as four feet. In Bataan, the town of Dinalupihan was placed under state of calamity after 22 barangays were affected by flash floods. In Pampanga, the NDCC placed the towns of Sta.Ana, San Luis, Minalin, Mexico, Macabebe, Masantol, Apalit, Guagua, Sasmuan, Lubao, and Bacolor in state of calamity due to rivers in Tarlac swelling.

More than 300, 000 residents of four northern provinces were affected by floods, including about 3,300 people who fled to evacuation centers and more than 41,000 who moved in with their relatives and friends. Overall damages were estimated of 25 million Philippine Peso in agricultural land.

=== September–October ===
The most significant loss of life and damage took place during late September and early October from the combined effects of Typhoons Ketsana and Parma. Together, the two storms killed over 600 people and left more than $300 million in damages.

==== Tropical Storm Ketsana (Ondoy) ====
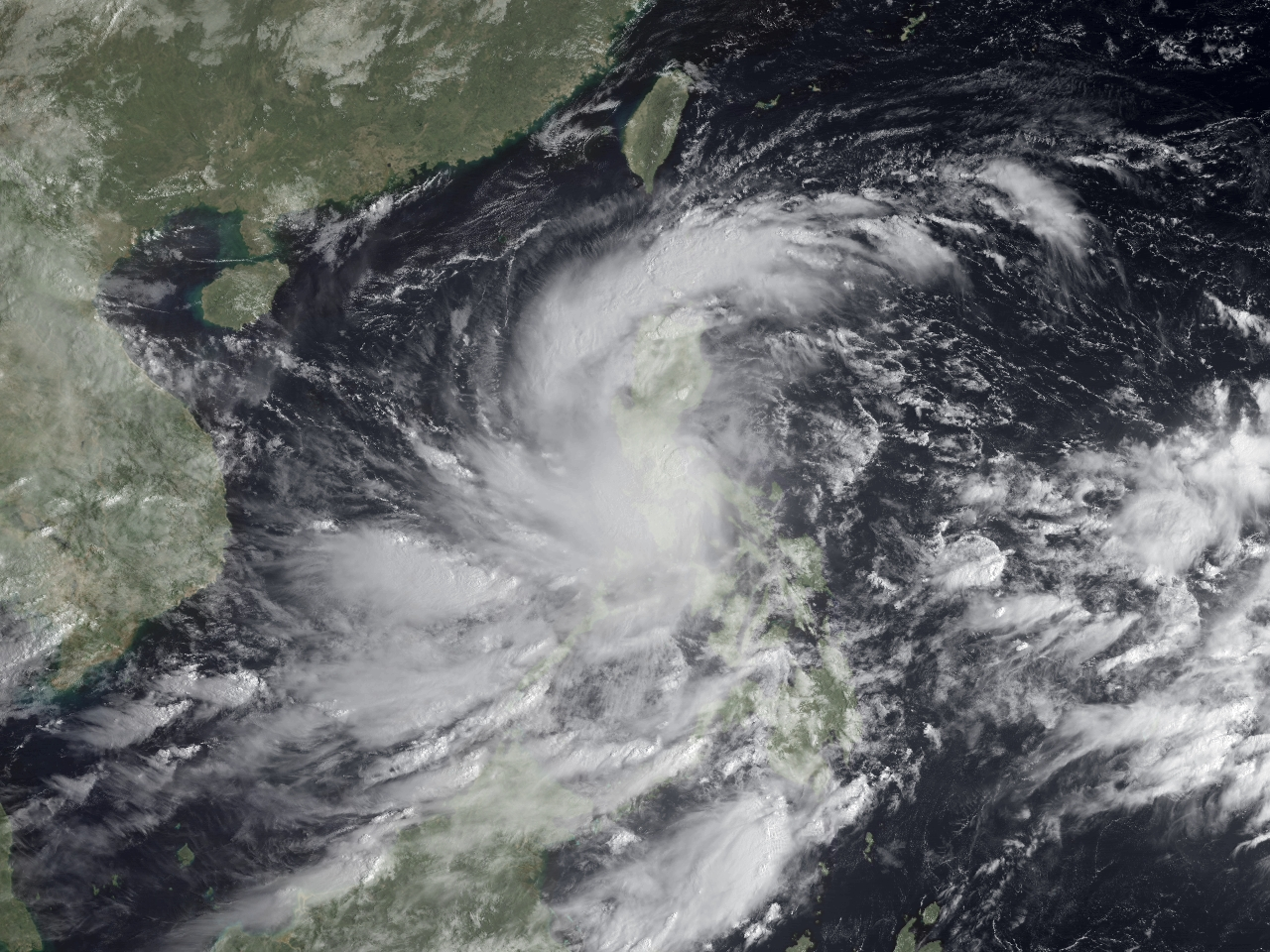
Tropical Storm Ketsana over the Philippines on September 26

During Typhoon Ketsana, on the afternoon of September 26, Teodoro declared an overall state of calamity in Metro Manila and other 25 provinces hit by the typhoon, allowing officials to utilize emergency funds for relief and rescue. Army troops, police and civilian volunteers were deployed to rescue victims. The Philippine National Red Cross and Philippine Coast Guard dispatched teams to rescue stranded and trapped people. At that time, flood average was from two-feet to waist high, and in some areas are more than six feet.

The resulting landslides and severe flooding left at least 246 people dead and 38 others missing. Public and private roads were clogged by vehicles stuck in floodwater. Thousands of motorists and more than 500 passengers were stranded at the North Luzon Expressway (NLEx). Distress calls and e-mails from thousands of Metro Manila residents and their worried relatives flooded TV and radio stations overnight as most of the power, communication and water lines were lost. Ketsana also caused the shutting down of flights and operations at Ninoy Aquino International Airport for almost a day.

The economic region of Metro Manila and many adjoining provinces incurred damages to both infrastructure and agriculture. Total damage of Ketsana as of September 28, 2009 is estimated at $100 million. Internet cafés, entertainment plazas, banks, food stores, building agencies and stores were soaked into flood and mud.

Compared to other storm-hit areas in the Philippines, Marikina was the most devastated region, where almost all of the city's area was submerged in water not more than ten feet and tons of knee-deep mud. During the typhoon, Marikina River broke off from its banks and transformed streets into rivers of flood. The breakage of the river from its dike causes heavy flooding on other Metro Manila streets. Marikina residential areas, particularly Provident Village, was severely flooded where at least eight people were found dead. Marikina itself recorded 78 deaths, the highest among Metro Manila cities.

At the height of the flooding, around 100,000 liters bunker oil from the paper manufacturing firm Noah's Paper Mill in Marikina spilled when pressurized by the surge. Most of the oil battered the city's barangays and small comparable amount combined with the Marikina River and basement of SM City Marikina. The spill will later complicate rescue efforts in the city. On September 29, National Power Corporation Flood Forecasting and Warning System released 500 cubic meters of stored water from the Angat Dam in Bulacan over a two-day period. The dam accumulated 100 cubic meters of water when Ketsana hit the province.

In Mindanao, several towns in Cotabato City and nearby Sultan Kudarat municipalities were submerged. The closing of national highway in Bulalo, Cotabato City led to the isolation of connecting towns for several days.

On September 28, an 11 am advisory of PAGASA was issued canceling all public storm signals in the country when Ketsana left Philippine Area of Responsibility.

==== Typhoon Parma (Pepeng) ====
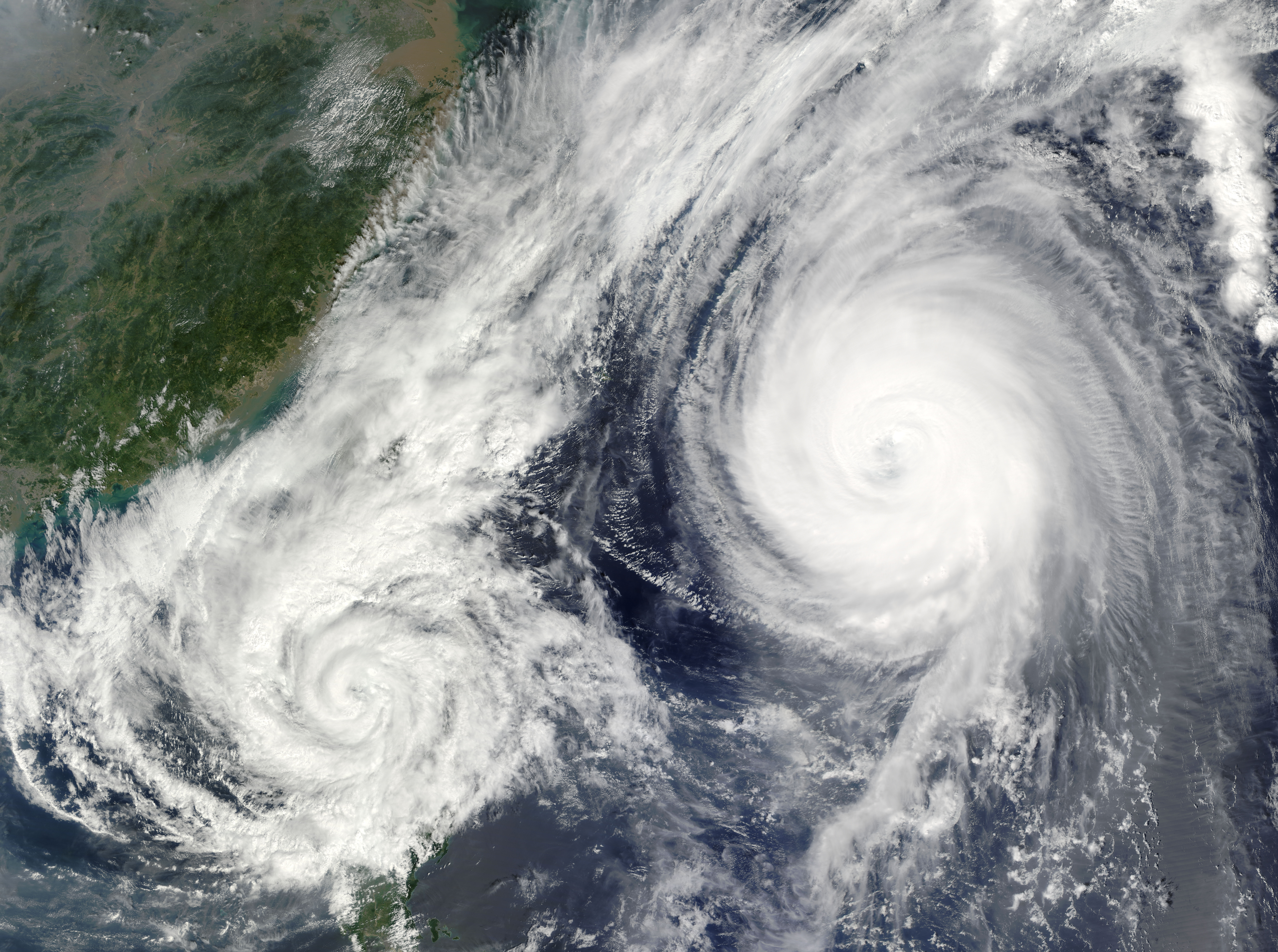
Severe Tropical Storm Parma as it made landfall in Northern Luzon for the second time after interacting with Typhoon Melor on October 6

Even though Parma would not make its landfall in northern Philippines, various transportation was suspended before the super typhoon drew near. In Catanduanes, where the first signal warning no.3 was raised, the province's power and communications were cut. Fallen trees were already in the main roads. About 30,000 families were evacuated. In addition to the Bicol region, more than 2,000 passengers were stranded in ferry stations. 39 provinces including Metro Manila were put to signal warnings, with each place experienced massive rainfall with strong winds. Parma made its landfall at Northeastern Cagayan at 3:00 pm PST/07:00 (UTC). In Cagayan, at least 6,036 people in 39 barangays (villages) were affected, while P20.33 million worth of agricultural produce were destroyed. Also, in the Chico River was swelled due to the typhoon, making the Maguilling Overflow Bridge along the Cagayan-Apayao Road impassable. The Maharlika Highway in Ilagan, Isabela to Cagayan became hardly passable due to the trees and electric posts that fell when Pepeng battered the area. Total power interruption also crippled the provinces of Kalinga, Apayao, and the northern towns of Isabela. In Kalinga, landslides were reported on roads linking the provincial capital, Tabuk, to upland towns. In Zambales, at least 2,100 families were evacuated as Pepeng brought heavy rains causing the Bucao River to swell. The Carael section of the Zambales highway became impassable due to rising floodwaters. Due to heavy downpour, the San Roque Dam in Eastern Pangasinan and Pantabangan Dam in Nueva Ecija was forced to release huge amount of water. It caused flooding in Eastern and Central Pangasinan as well as Nueva Ecija. In Metro Manila the area is still experienced torrential rains and strong winds. Floodwaters continue to rise in some areas in Metro Manila and Calabarzon. In Pateros, Muntinlupa, and Taguig, in Taytay town in Rizal province, and in the towns of Biñan and San Pedro in Laguna province, the flood is not subsiding. Laguna de Bay is breaking a 90-year record in meters of water, which threatens to submerge more areas in Metro Manila. In Benguet, a landslide killed at least 200 as Tropical Depression Parma continues to bring rain across northern Luzon.

=== Rest of the year ===
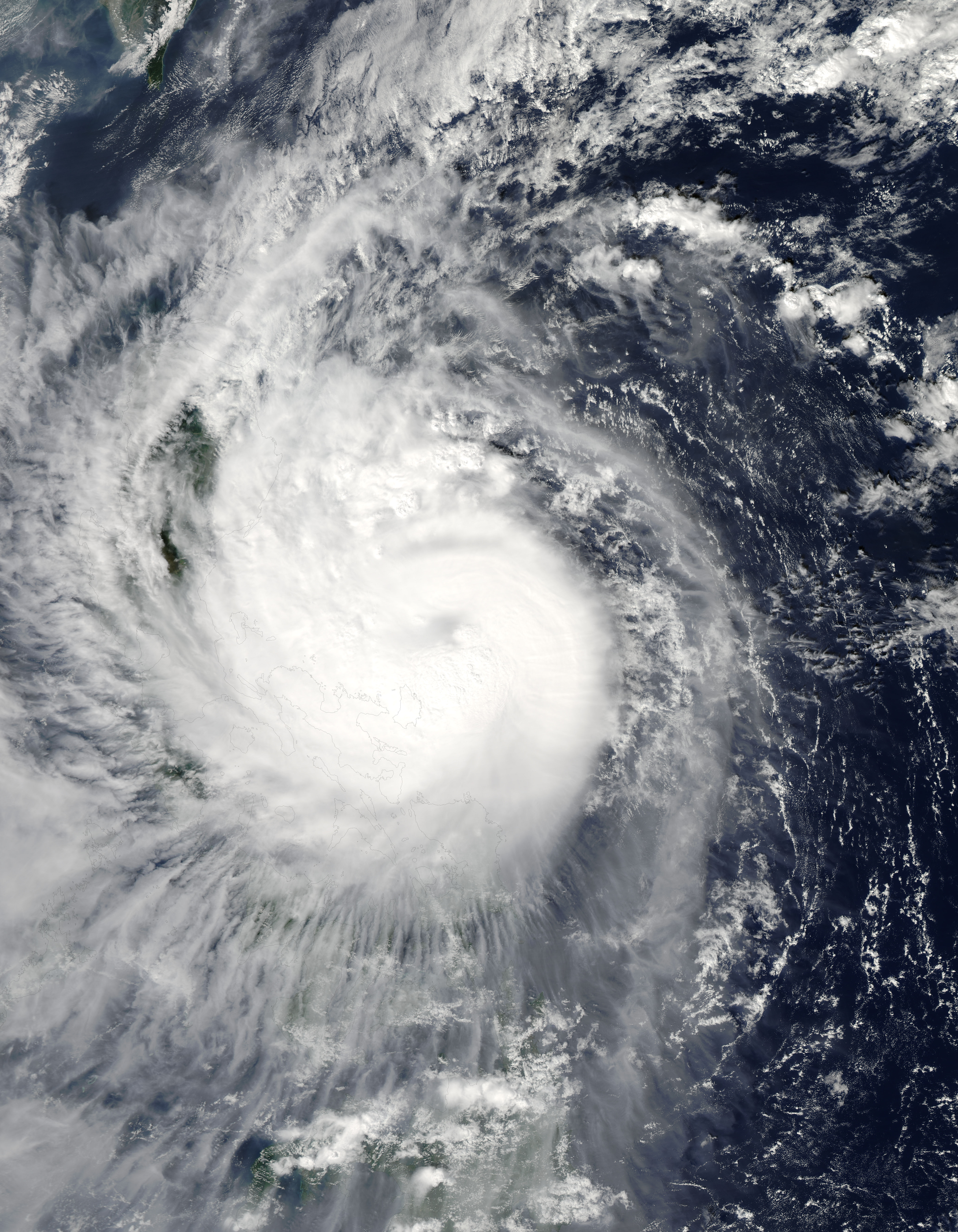
Typhoon Mirinae approaching the Philippines on October 30

The rest of the year saw six more storms, but only two made landfall and added some more damage already caused by Ketsana and Parma.

While Parma (Pepeng) was still drifting over northern Luzon, Melor entered PAGASA's area of responsibility, and therefore was named Quedan. While it did not make landfall on any part of the country, its interaction with Typhoon Parma would cause Melor to weaken and shift course to Japan while Parma crossed Northern Luzon three times, therefore bringing rain, wind and destruction over the area.

Lupit (Ramil) was the next typhoon to directly hit any part of the Philippines, having threatened the areas already ravaged by Typhoon Parma. While initially forecasted by PAGASA to cross Cagayan or Batanes by, Ramil eventually veered northeast in spite of strengthening, sparing the areas still recovering from Pepeng's wrath. However, it brought little to moderate rain from Cagayan to as far as Southern Luzon. Despite this incident, local governments in Northern Luzon prepared for the worst, even putting medical personnel on "Code Blue" (on-duty 24/7) and having army contingents sent out by the national government It also forced planes and buses, especially those going north, to suspend trips. Dams also released water, exactly like when Parma hit the area.

Mirinae (Santi) was the last significant storm to make landfall on any part of the country. It took the similar direction that Ondoy went through as it wreaked havoc over Philippines, and therefore again hitting the capital Manila and nearby provinces. Hitting just before the Philippine holiday, All Saints' Day, it went through Quezon Province, Batangas and Cavite. It lashed strong winds, rain, and added some more damage to the areas still recovering from Ondoy, especially flooded areas in Rizal Province and Laguna. But its passage is rather quick; this spared the affected areas from further devastation; however, it left at least 13 dead. Dams also released water, like what happened when Parma hit Northern Luzon. Power outages became widespread especially over Manila as Santi was over Southern Tagalog region; they were subsequently restored

Tropical depression Urduja brought torrential rain over Visayas, killing four people and making roads impassable over the affected areas.

Tropical depression Tino and Typhoon Nida (Vinta) were observed over PAGASA's area of responsibility, but did little to no damage.

== Aftermath ==
During the end of 2009, PAGASA had announced that the names Ondoy and Pepeng will be retired after causing damages well over P1 billion and death toll exceeding over 300. PAGASA, early on 2012, updated their naming list and replaced the retired names by Odette and Paolo for the 2013 season.

== See also ==
- Typhoon
- Typhoons in the Philippines
- 2009 Pacific typhoon season
- Effects of the 2013 Pacific typhoon season in the Philippines
