= List of storms named Urduja =

The name Urduja has been used for three tropical cyclones in the Philippine Area of Responsibility by PAGASA in the Western Pacific Ocean. It refers to a legendary warrior princess in Filipino folklore. It replaced the unused names Ubbeng and Undang slated to be used in 2001 and 2005 respectively.

- Tropical Depression 27W (2009) (T0927, 27W, Urduja) – a short-lived cyclone that developed east of Mindanao
- Typhoon Francisco (2013) (T1327, 26W, Urduja) – a violent, Category 5-equivalent typhoon which passed southeast of Okinawa and mainland Japan
- Tropical Storm Kai-tak (2017) (T1726, 32W, Urduja) – a moderately strong tropical storm that traversed the Visayas region of the Philippines, causing more than ₱1 billion worth of damage.

The name Urduja was retired following the 2017 Pacific typhoon season and was replaced with Uwan, which means rain in Cebuano. The name was first (and only) used in 2025.

- Typhoon Fung-wong (2025) (T2526, 32W, Uwan) – A very large and destructive Category 4-typhoon that brushed the Philippines and Taiwan.

The name Uwan was retired following the 2025 Pacific typhoon season and was replaced with Urbano, which is a papal regnal name, for the 2029 season.
