= Typhoon Francisco (2013) =

Pacific typhoon in 2013

Typhoon Francisco (Urduja)
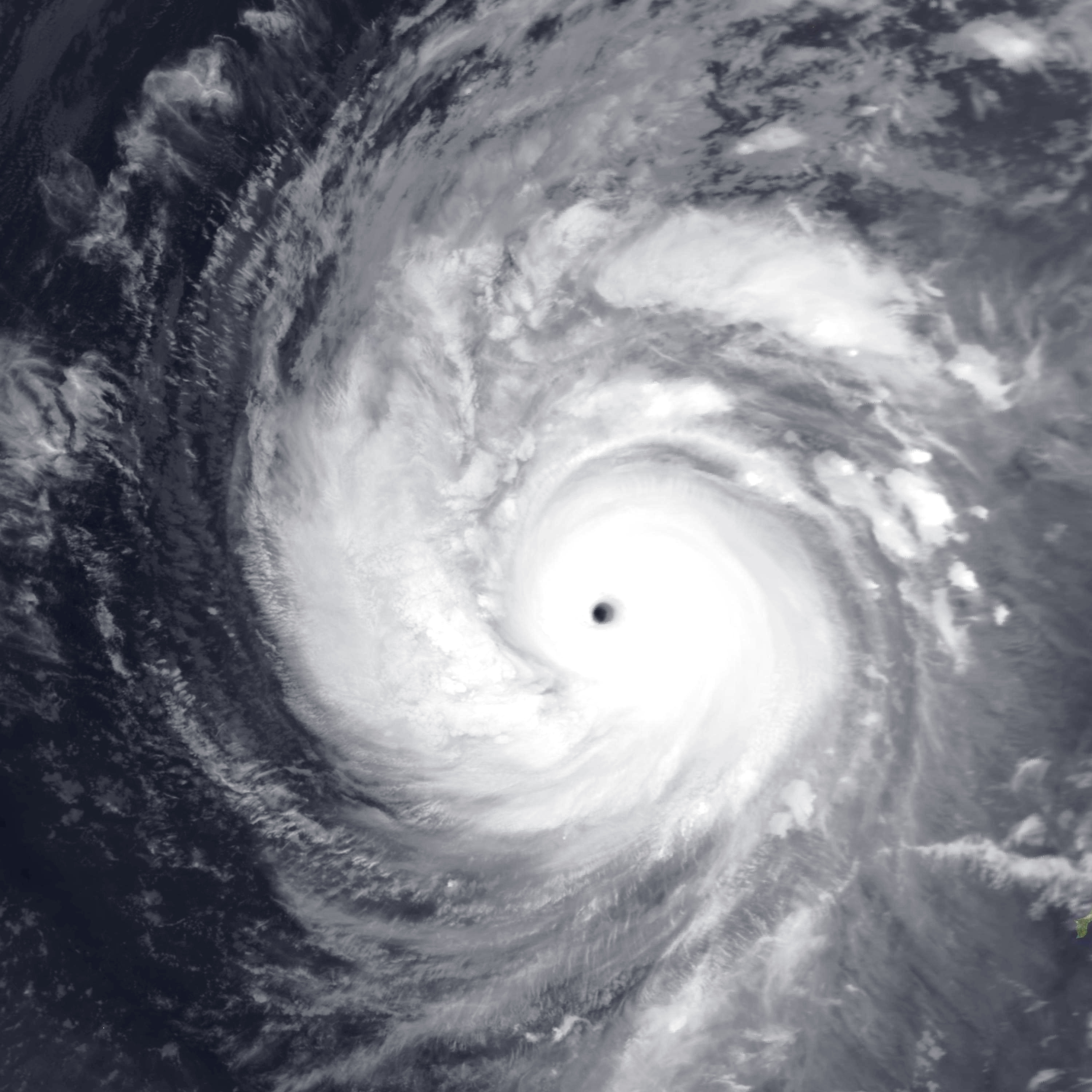
- Typhoon Francisco at peak intensity on October 19

Meteorological history
- Formed: October 15, 2013
- Dissipated: October 26, 2013

Violent typhoon
- 10-minute sustained (JMA)
- Highest winds: 195 km/h (120 mph)
- Lowest pressure: 920 hPa (mbar); 27.17 inHg

Category 5-equivalent super typhoon
- 1-minute sustained (SSHWS/JTWC)
- Highest winds: 260 km/h (160 mph)
- Lowest pressure: 918 hPa (mbar); 27.11 inHg

Overall effects
- Fatalities: None
- Damage: $150,000
- Areas affected: Guam, Ryukyu Islands, Japan
- IBTrACS
- Part of the 2013 Pacific typhoon season

Typhoon Francisco, (Note: The name Francisco (Chamorro: Francisco, [fɾænsisko]) was contributed by the United States and is a masculine given name in Chamorro.) known in the Philippines as Super Typhoon Urduja, was a powerful typhoon that strengthened to the equivalent of a Category 5 on the Saffir-Simpson scale, according to the Joint Typhoon Warning Center. The 25th named storm and the 10th typhoon of the 2013 Pacific typhoon season, Francisco formed on October 16 east of Guam from a pre-existing area of convection. With favorable conditions, it quickly intensified into a tropical storm before passing south of Guam. After stalling to the southwest of the island, Francisco turned to the northwest into an environment of warm waters and low wind shear, becoming a typhoon. The JTWC upgraded it to super typhoon status on October 18, while the Japan Meteorological Agency (JMA) estimated peak 10-minute sustained winds of 195 km/h (121 mph). Gradual weakening ensued, and after the typhoon turned to the northeast, Francisco deteriorated into a tropical storm on October 24. Passing southeast of Okinawa and mainland Japan, the storm accelerated and became extratropical on October 26, dissipating later that day.

On Guam and in the Northern Marianas Islands, Francisco produced tropical storm force wind gusts, strong enough to knock over some trees and cause $150,000 (2013 USD) in damage. The typhoon also dropped heavy rainfall on Guam, peaking at 201 mm (7.9 in) at Inarajan. Later, Francisco brought gusty winds and some rainfall to Okinawa. In Kagoshima Prefecture, 3,800 homes lost power, while an island-wide evacuation advisory was issued for Izu Ōshima after Typhoon Wipha spawned a deadly mudslide a week prior. Rains in Japan peaked at 600 mm (24 in) in Niyodogawa, Kōchi on Shikoku.

== Meteorological history ==
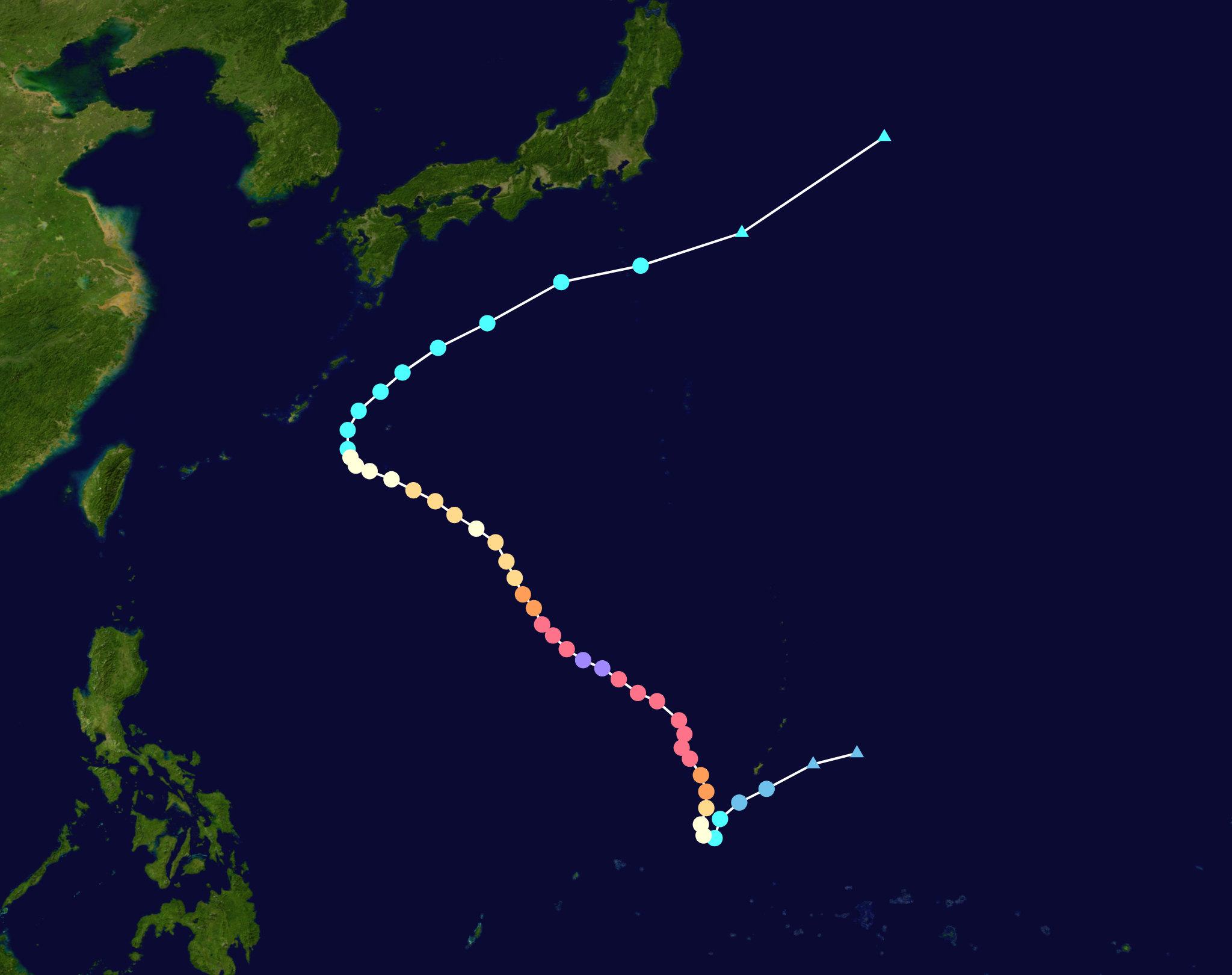
Map plotting the storm's track and intensity, according to the Saffir–Simpson scale Map key Saffir–Simpson scale Tropical depression (≤38 mph, ≤62 km/h) Tropical storm (39–73 mph, 63–118 km/h) Category 1 (74–95 mph, 119–153 km/h) Category 2 (96–110 mph, 154–177 km/h) Category 3 (111–129 mph, 178–208 km/h) Category 4 (130–156 mph, 209–251 km/h) Category 5 (≥157 mph, ≥252 km/h) Unknown Storm type Tropical cyclone Subtropical cyclone Extratropical cyclone, remnant low, tropical disturbance, or monsoon depression

Early on October 15, an area of convection persisted about 750 km (470 mi) east-northeast of Guam. Initially the system was located within an area of moderate wind shear, although conditions gradually became more favorable for tropical cyclogenesis. At 12:00 UTC on October 15, the Japan Meteorological Agency (JMA) (Note: The Japan Meteorological Agency is the official Regional Specialized Meteorological Center for the western Pacific Ocean.) estimated that a tropical depression developed about 450 km (280 mi) east of Guam. A few hours later, the Joint Typhoon Warning Center (JTWC) (Note: The Joint Typhoon Warning Center is a joint United States Navy – United States Air Force task force that issues tropical cyclone warnings for the western Pacific Ocean and other regions.) issued a tropical cyclone formation alert before initiating advisories on Tropical Depression 26W early on October 16. At that time, the depression was passing about 100 km (62 mi) southeast of Guam. After formation, the system moved west-southwestward under a ridge to the north. Its circulation consolidated as the thunderstorm activity organized, aided by warm sea surface temperatures and decreasing wind shear. At 06:00 UTC on October 16, the JMA upgraded the depression to Tropical Storm Francisco (1327).

As a quickly organizing tropical cyclone, Francisco developed an eye-like feature late on October 16 in the center of the convection, as outflow improved and an anticyclone formed aloft. Based on the improved structure, the JMA upgraded Francisco to a severe tropical storm at 18:00 UTC on October 16, followed by upgrading it to typhoon status at 06:00 UTC the next day. Francisco slowed its forward motion as steering currents weakened, with a north-northwest drift beginning on October 17 due to an extension of the subtropical ridge. By later that day, the typhoon had a well-defined eye 28 km (17 mi) across and surrounded by deep convection, while passing west of Guam and the Northern Marianas Islands. The track accelerated more to the northwest, steered by the strengthening ridge. With the eyewall convection become more distinct, Francisco continued to intensify, and the JTWC upgraded it to a super typhoon on October 18. At 18:00 UTC, the JMA estimated the typhoon attained peak 10-minute sustained winds of 195 km/h (121 mph). On October 19, the JTWC upgraded Francisco to peak 1‑minute winds of 260 km/h (160 mph), the equivalent of a Category 5 on the Saffir-Simpson scale; by that time, the eyewall contracted to just 19 km (12 mi) in diameter.

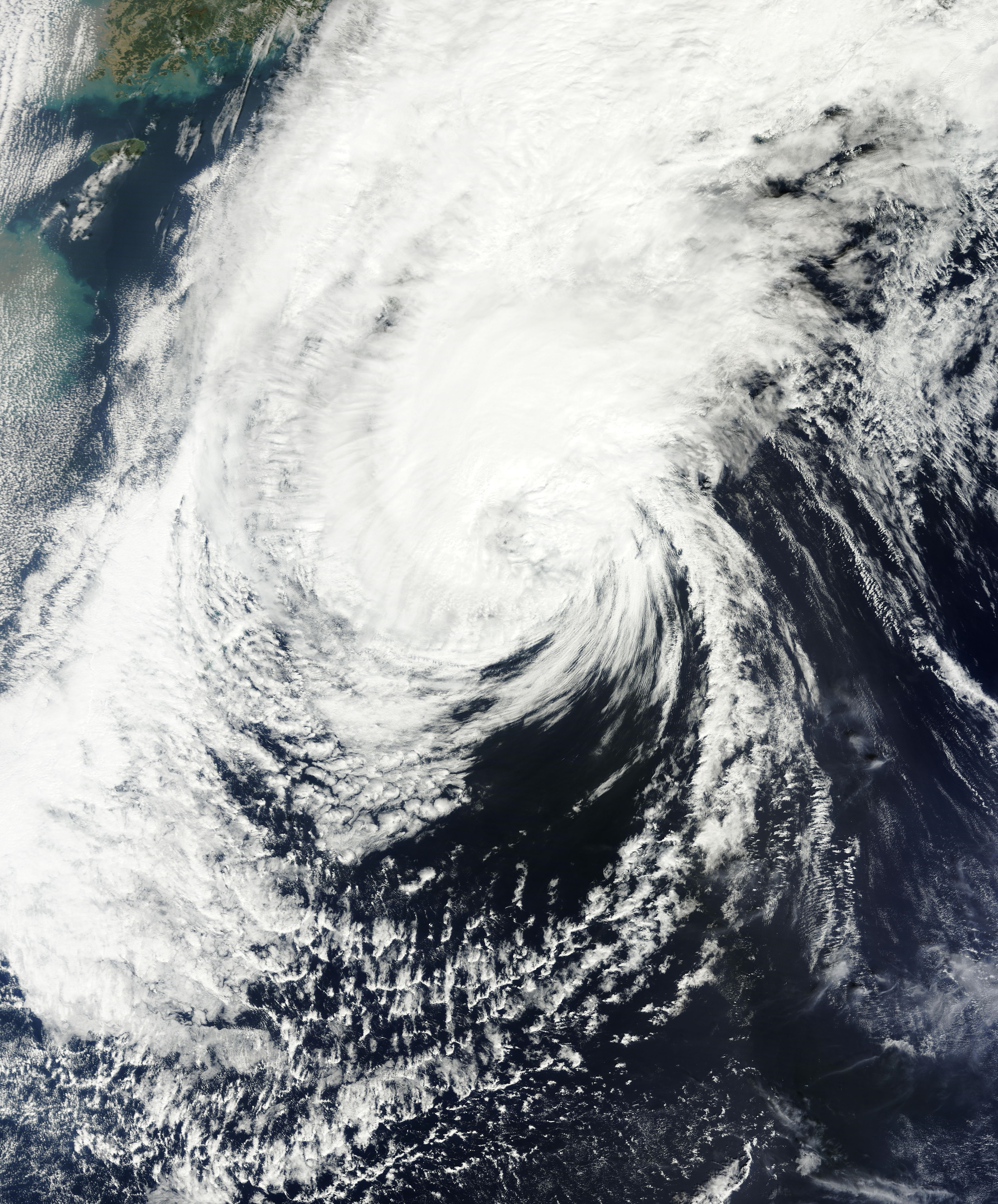
Severe Tropical Storm Francisco south of Japan on October 25

After maintaining its peak intensity for about 36 hours, Francisco began weakening, after the eye lost definition due to building wind shear. By October 21, the eye became ragged and cloud-filled while the overall satellite presentation of the storm became elongated. That day, the typhoon entered the area of responsibility of the Philippine Atmospheric, Geophysical and Astronomical Services Administration (PAGASA), which gave Francisco the local name Urduja; the agency would cease issuing advisories on October 23. Conditions generally remained favorable, allowing the eye to remain distinct despite a great reduction in the sustained winds. Dry air began affecting the tropical cyclone late on October 22, cutting off the flow of moist air, and water temperatures cooled along the storm's track. As a result, the eye dissipated and the convection weakened. An approaching trough from the Korean Peninsula weakened the ridge to the north, slowing the typhoon and allowing it to turn north and northeast on October 24. Francisco weakened below typhoon status after passing 210 km (130 mi) southeast of Okinawa. The storm began interacting with the approaching cold front while it passed south of Japan, moving around the subtropical ridge. With increasing wind shear, the circulation became exposed from the convection, and the JTWC discontinued advisories on October 25, declaring that Francisco was becoming extratropical. On the next day, Francisco completed its extratropical transition, but dissipated later on October 26, to the southeast of Japan.

== Preparations and impact ==
While Francisco was developing near Guam, the local National Weather Service office issued a tropical storm watch for Guam, Rota, Tinian, and Saipan. On Guam, 1,223 people evacuated to nine schools serving as emergency shelters. A cross country invitational was delayed by one day due to the storm. As a developing system, Francisco passed south of Guam and the Northern Marianas Islands. Gusts on Guam reached 84 km/h (52 mph) at Andersen Air Force Base, while Saipan and Rota reported winds of 63 and 61 km/h (39 and 38 mph), respectively. Wind gusts were not as strong when the typhoon approached the islands for a second time. The typhoon also dropped heavy rainfall on Guam, peaking at 201 mm (7.9 in) at Inarajan. Damage in the region totaled $150,000 (2013 USD), and was largely limited to fallen trees. There was a power outage on Guam during the storm, but the Guam Power Authority was able to quickly restore service; this was due to the first usage of newly installed meters that showed exactly where the cuts had occurred.

Later, while passing near Okinawa, Francisco brought gusty winds and some rainfall. The threat of the storm prompted organizers to cancel a tennis tournament in Kantō. The looming storm also forced the Japanese refiner company Nansei Sekiyu KK to suspend some marine operations at its facility on Okinawa. After the storm, about 100 United States military on the island helped clear debris and sand from the road. Unsettled weather from the typhoon caused an Oita Heat Devils basketball game to be canceled. Francisco's gusty winds left about 3,800 homes without power in Kagoshima Prefecture. Heavy rainfall occurred across Shikoku, including a 48‑hour total of about 600 mm (24 in) at Niyodogawa, Kōchi. On Izu Ōshima, officials advised all 8,365 residents to evacuate, the first such advisory in 27 years. About 1,300 people were under mandatory evacuation orders. This was after Typhoon Wipha spawned a deadly mudslide a week prior. Rainfall at Izu Ōshima totaled around 150 mm (5.9 in). Evacuees were allowed to return after the storm exited the area.

== See also ==
- Typhoon Lekima (2013)
- Typhoon Choi-wan (2009)
- Typhoon Dolphin (2015)
