= Typhoon Wipha (2013) =

Pacific typhoon in 2013

Typhoon Wipha (Tino)
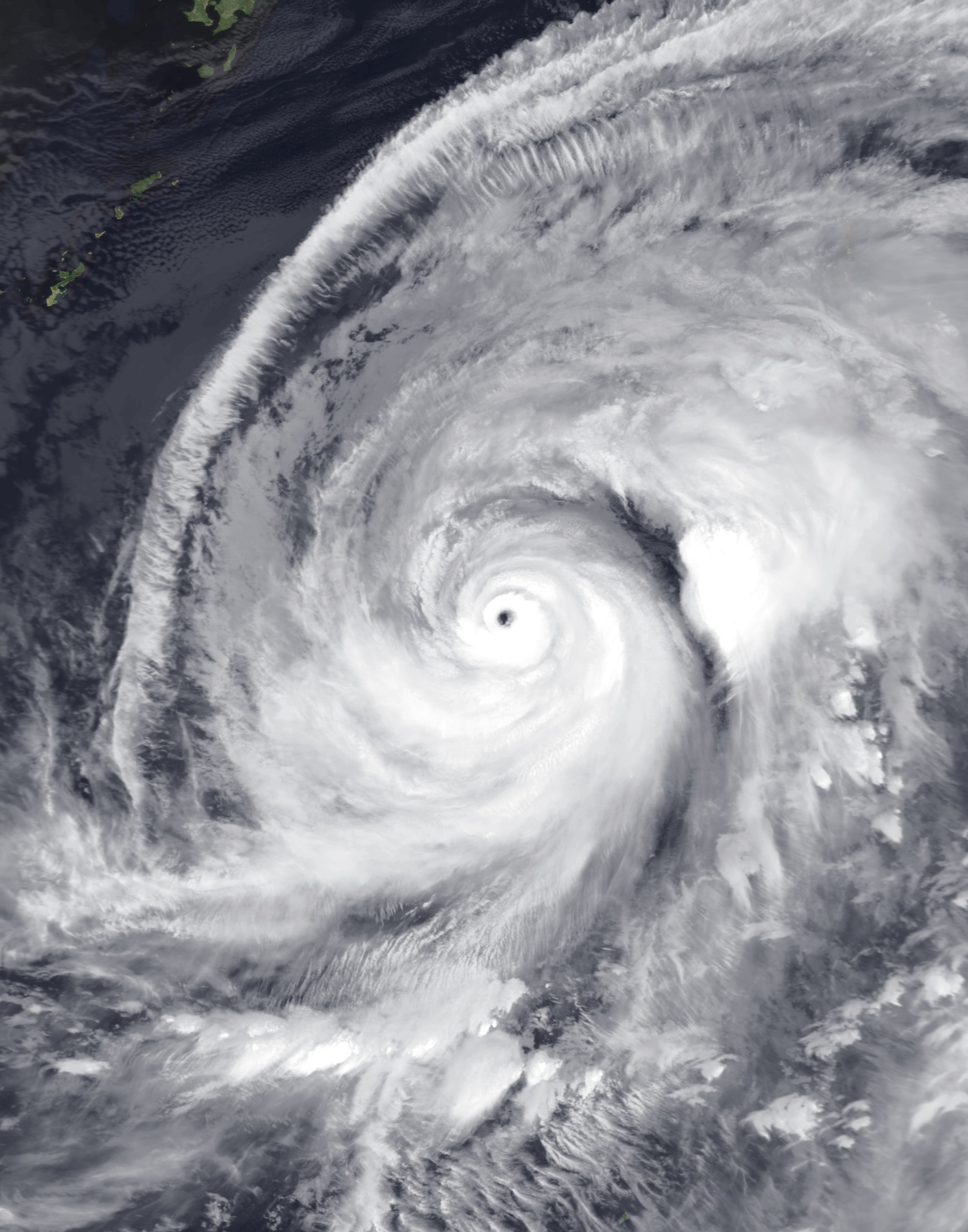
- Typhoon Wipha at peak intensity on October 13

Meteorological history
- Formed: October 9, 2013
- Post-tropical: October 16, 2013
- Dissipated: October 22, 2013

Very strong typhoon
- 10-minute sustained (JMA)
- Highest winds: 165 km/h (105 mph)
- Lowest pressure: 930 hPa (mbar); 27.46 inHg

Category 4-equivalent typhoon
- 1-minute sustained (SSHWS/JTWC)
- Highest winds: 220 km/h (140 mph)
- Lowest pressure: 933 hPa (mbar); 27.55 inHg

Overall effects
- Fatalities: 41 total
- Damage: $404.8 million (2013 USD)
- Areas affected: Northern Mariana Islands, Guam, Japan, Russian Far East, Alaska
- IBTrACS
- Part of the 2013 Pacific typhoon season

Typhoon Wipha, (Note: The name Wipha (Thai: วิภา, [wi˦˥(ʔ) pʰaː˧]) was contributed by Thailand and is a feminine given name meaning "luster, brilliance" in Thai.) known in the Philippines as Typhoon Tino, was a large typhoon that caused extensive damage in Japan in mid-October 2013. It is the twenty-fifth named storm and the ninth typhoon of the annual typhoon season.

The system originated from a tropical depression well to the east of Guam on October 8. Tracking generally westward, development of the depression was initially slow; however, on October 11, favorable atmospheric conditions allowed for rapid intensification. The depression strengthened to a tropical storm that day, receiving the name Wipha at the time, and reached typhoon status on October 12. Now moving northwestward, Wipha grew into a very large system and ultimately attained its peak intensity on October 14 with winds of 165 km/h (105 mph) and an atmospheric pressure of 930 mbar (hPa; 27.46 inHg). Accelerating and turning more northerly, the typhoon weakened as conditions became less conducive for tropical cyclones. Wipha dramatically accelerated northeastward on October 15 as it interacted with a stalled out front over Japan. Simultaneously, the storm began transitioning into an extratropical cyclone, a process which it completed early on October 16.

== Meteorological history ==
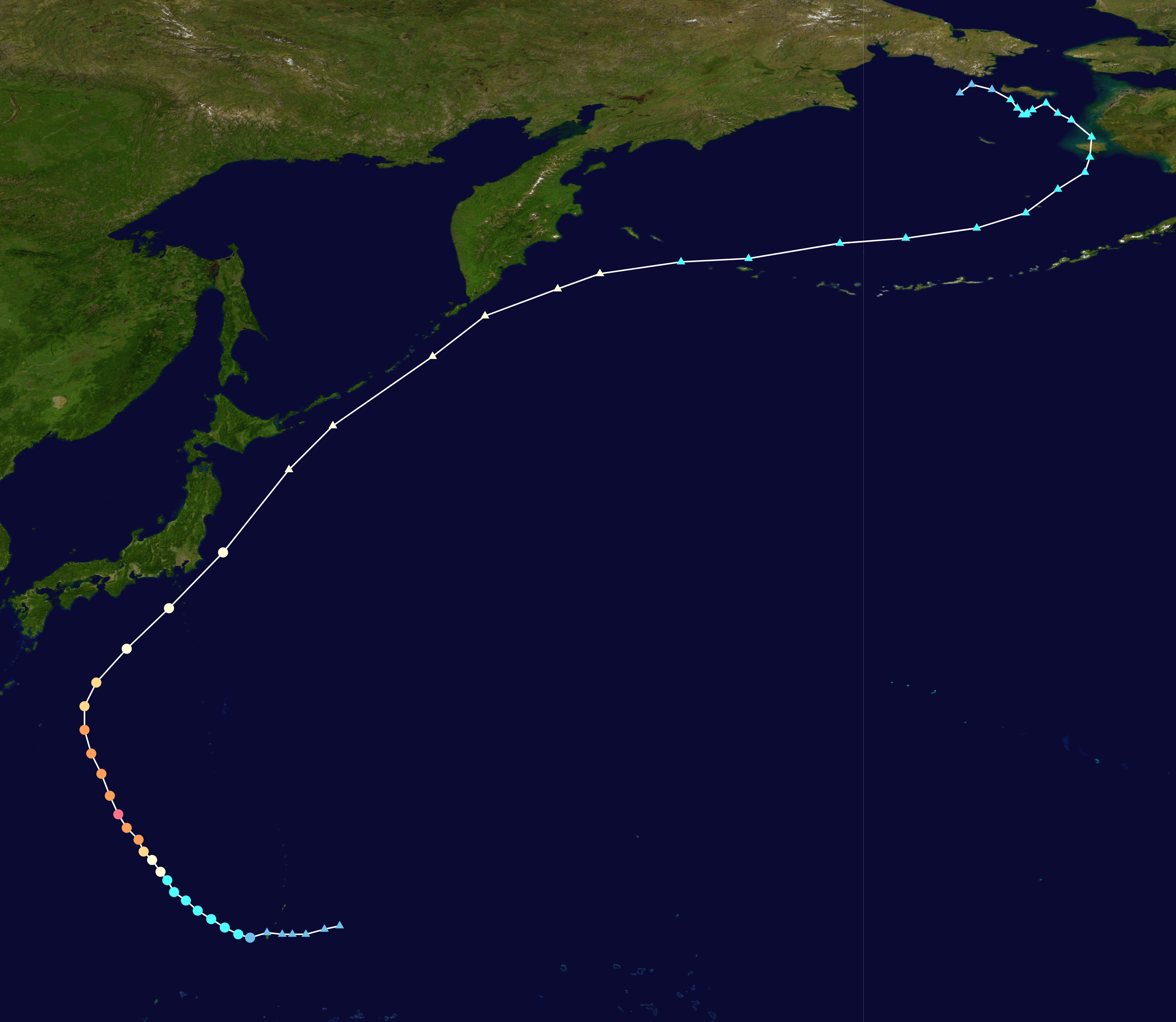
Map plotting the storm's track and intensity, according to the Saffir–Simpson scale Map key Saffir–Simpson scale Tropical depression (≤38 mph, ≤62 km/h) Tropical storm (39–73 mph, 63–118 km/h) Category 1 (74–95 mph, 119–153 km/h) Category 2 (96–110 mph, 154–177 km/h) Category 3 (111–129 mph, 178–208 km/h) Category 4 (130–156 mph, 209–251 km/h) Category 5 (≥157 mph, ≥252 km/h) Unknown Storm type Tropical cyclone Subtropical cyclone Extratropical cyclone, remnant low, tropical disturbance, or monsoon depression

Early on October 8, 2013, the United States Joint Typhoon Warning Center (JTWC) reported that a tropical disturbance had developed within an area of low to moderate vertical wind shear, about 670 km (415 mi) to the east-southeast of Anderson Air Force Base on the island of Guam. During that day, atmospheric convection started to wrap around into a consolidating low level circulation center, before the Japan Meteorological Agency (JMA) started to monitor the system as a tropical depression early the next day.

During October 10, the JTWC initiated advisories on the system and designated it as Tropical Depression 25W. Afterwards, 25W had intensified and have been declared a tropical storm, while the JMA gave the tropical storm name Wipha (1326). Later on, the JMA classified Wipha as a severe tropical storm when it strengthened on October 11, and later on October 12, 2013, Wipha intensified into a typhoon. As it was slowly moving, Wipha entered an area of warm waters and low wind shear. Due to this, the cyclone rapidly intensified into a minimal category 4 typhoon. As it did, Wipha developed a compact, small, clear eye. On the noon of October 14, the Philippine Atmospheric, Geophysical and Astronomical Services Administration, also known as PAGASA, noticed that Wipha had entered the Philippine area of responsibility. As it did, it received the Philippine name Tino. As it weakened into a category 3 typhoon, then into a category 2 typhoon, Wipha left PAGASA's area of responsibility . Early on October 15, Wipha rapidly enfeebled as the ocean waters surrounding the typhoon began to cool as it approached Japan with category 1 status. As it came closer, it dumped very heavy rain in many areas of East Japan, killing 25. Afterwards, it was then reported that an additional 16 people perished due to landslides and flashfloods.The storm reached extratropical status late on October 16. The remnants of Wipha continued to be extratropical as it was located southeast of the Kamchatka Peninsula on October 17. As it continued to speed up, Wipha's extratropical remnant low was last noted by the JMA during October 18, after it had crossed the international dateline and moved out of the JMA's area of responsibility.

== Preparations and impact ==
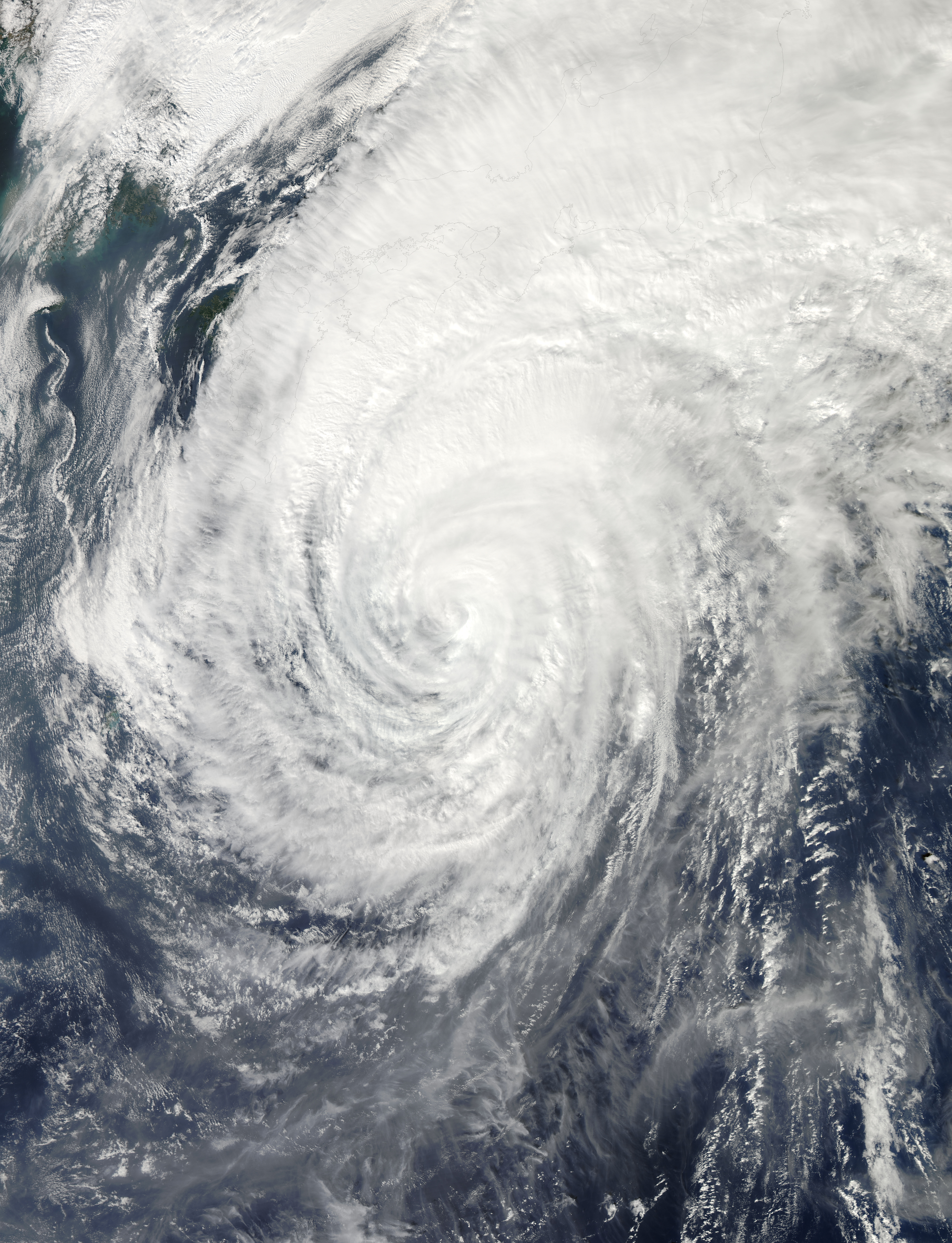
Typhoon Wipha approaching Japan on October 15

In anticipation of heavy rains at the debilitated Fukushima Daiichi Nuclear Power Plant, the Tokyo Electric Power Company (TEPCO) placed sandbags around a drainage ditch holding back radioactive water. Regarded as a "once in a decade storm" by the JMA, schools throughout Tokyo were closed on October 16. Significant disruptions to transportation took place, with over 60,000 people having their flights canceled and train service in parts of the city was suspended. Cosmo Oil, Fuji Oil, Idemitsu Kosan, and JX Holdings suspended shipments in eastern Japan while Nissan cancelled shipments for the day.

Typhoon Wipha weakened as it skirted Japan's eastern coastline on October 15. Though the storm caused only limited damage on the mainland, it spawned a massive landslide on the island of Izu Ōshima, killing at least 31 and leaving 13 others missing. In addition, a woman was killed in western Tokyo, and the body of one of two schoolchildren who went missing near Kanagawa was later found. A man in Chiba and the other child were still reported missing, in addition to the victims on Oshima. At least 350 homes were destroyed throughout Japan, mostly on Izu Ōshima.

At the Fukushima Daiichi plant, 12 water storage tanks overflowed from the typhoon's heavy rains. Beta radiation levels skyrocketed to 400,000 becquerels in the wake of the storm, 6,500 times greater than prior to Wipha. The overflow was blamed on TEPCO's inadequate preparation and not heeding warnings of the storm. In addition, beta radiation was detected in areas beyond the levees designed to hold back contaminated water. On October 24, it was announced that radiation levels in water near the Fukushima nuclear plant reached an all-time high of 140,000 becquerels, greatly surpassing the previous peak of 59,000 becquerels. The spike in radiation is at least partially attributed to torrential rains from Typhoon Wipha.

=== Izu-Oshima ===
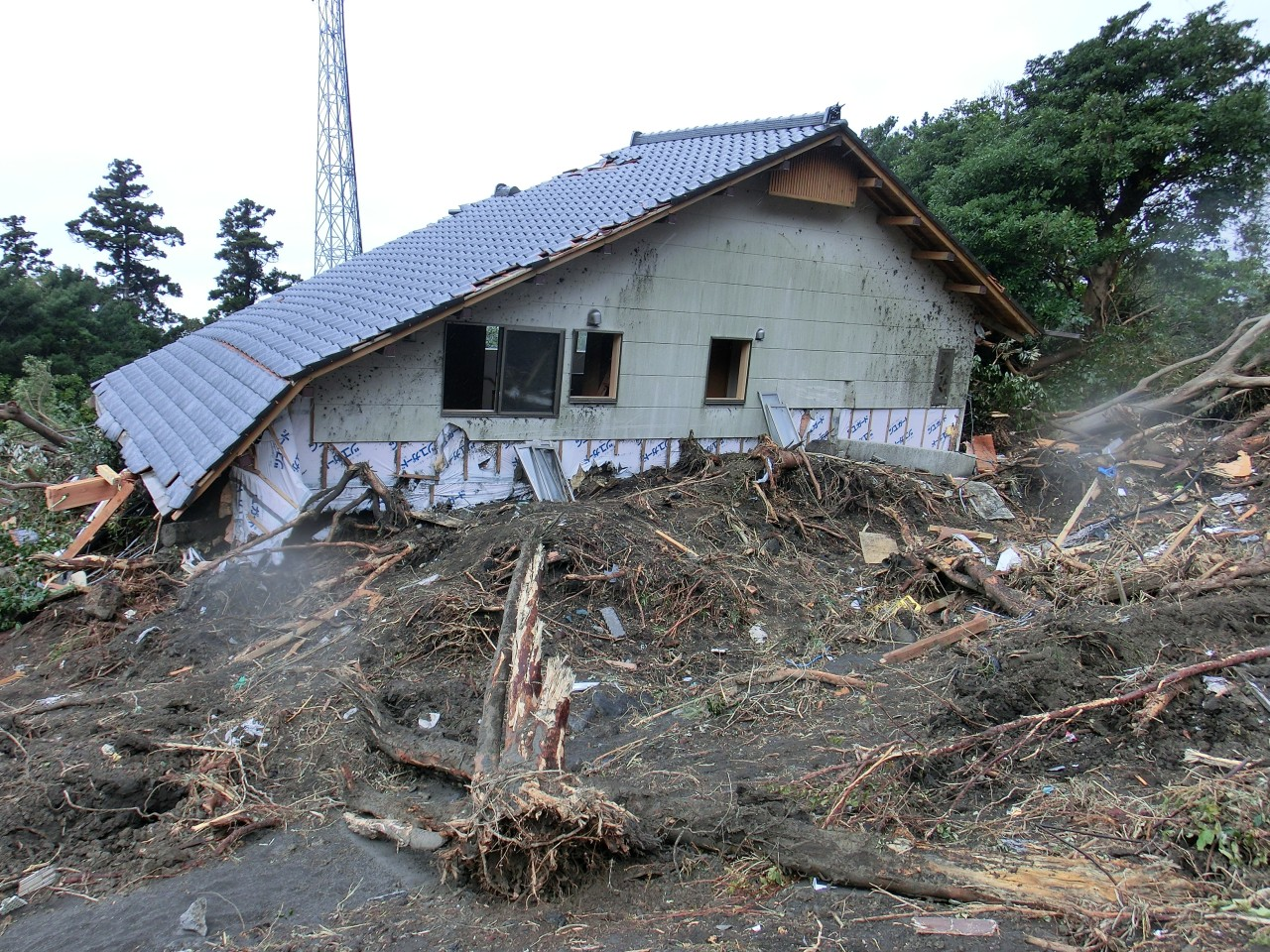
Debris flow in Izu-Oshima by Wipha

During October 15, the JMA issued a mudslide warning for the volcanic islands of Izu-Oshima and Miyakejima, which was subsequently relayed to the Tokyo Metropolitan government which sent a fax transmission to the affected local governments. However, while the Miyakejima government got the warning and advised residents to evacuate, the staff in the Izu-Oshima town office had left for the day with only a security guard left on duty. As a result, local officials did not see the advisory until around midnight local time, by which time they had decided it was too dangerous, to ask residents to leave their homes and did not issue an evacuation order. During the next day as Wipha moved towards the north-northwest it caused heavy rain in the town of Oshima, where an hourly rainfall total of 100 mm (3.9 in) and a 24-hour total of 824 mm (32.4 in) were recorded. As a result of the rainfall several landslides, debris flows and slope failures were recorded in the thin volcanic ash layer of hillside surfaces, which resulted in at least 41 fatalities. Damage in the island reached ¥40 billion (US$404.8 million).

During the systems aftermath the Government of Japan quickly established a disaster response office in Oshima Town, to support the evacuation of residents and help prevent any secondary disasters. The Government also dispatched the Technical Emergency Control Force (TEC‐FORCE) and the Japan Self-Defense Forces to the island to conduct search and rescue operations, evaluate the extent of the damage and help prevent secondary disasters. The Tokyo Metropolitan government was criticized by the media for using a fax machine to relay the warnings despite vastly improved technology. However, the metropolitan government stood by its use of fax machines to disseminate warnings as it enabled them to transmit warnings all at once. During October 17, the mayor of Izu Oshima Island issued a public apology for not issuing an evacuation order and admitted the order could have saved lives.

== See also ==
- Typhoon Tip
- Typhoon Roke (2011)
- Typhoon Phanfone (2014)
- Typhoon Lan (2017)
- Typhoon Talim (2017)
- Typhoon Jebi (2018)
- Typhoon Hagibis (2019)
